= List of national founders =

List of people credited with creating the state

The following is a list of national founders of sovereign states who were credited with establishing a state. National founders are typically those who played an influential role in setting up the systems of governance, (i.e., political system form of government, and constitution), of the country. They can also be military leaders of a war of independence that led to the establishment of a sovereign state.

== Africa ==
=== Burkina Faso ===
Maurice Yaméogo was the first Upper Voltese premier of French Upper Volta, being appointed in 1958 and became the first president of the Republic of Upper Volta from 1960 to 1966. Yaméogo was politically disenfranchised and all of his titles were denounced in 1970 under the orders of Sangoulé Lamizana before being rehabilitated in 1991 by Blaise Compaoré as the national founder. In 1984, president of Upper Volta, Thomas Sankara as a part of his socialist and anti-French reforms renamed the country to Burkina Faso as well as adopting the national anthem, Ditanyè, which was written by Sankara himself. In 2023, Sankara was declared the hero of Burkina Faso and the "true" national founder by president Ibrahim Traoré.

=== Cape Verde ===
Amílcar Cabral (var. Amílcar Lopes da Costa Cabral) (1924–1973) was an agricultural engineer, writer, and a nationalist thinker and political leader. He was also one of Africa's foremost anti-colonial leaders. Amílcar Cabral led the nationalist movement of Guinea-Bissau and Cape Verde Islands and the ensuing war of independence in Guinea-Bissau. He was assassinated on 20 January 1973, several months before Guinea-Bissau's unilateral declaration of independence. He is considered a founder of Cape Verde. Aristides Pereira served as first President of Cape Verde from 1975 to 1991.

=== Central African Republic ===
David Dacko served as first President of Central African Republic from 1960 to 1966. The constitution outlines him as being the "Founding Father".

=== Democratic Republic of the Congo ===
Patrice Lumumba, Joseph Kasa-Vubu, Albert Kalonji, Jean Bolikango, Cléophas Kamitatu, and Paul Bolya are all considered "Fathers of Independence" in the Congo.

=== Egypt ===
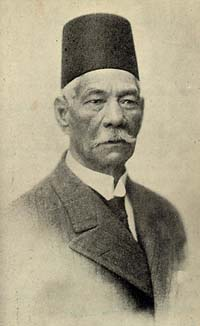
Saad Zaghloul is seen as the founder of independent Egypt. "Zaeem al Ummah (Leader of the Nation)"

The prevailing historical view is that Muhammad Ali (1769–1849) is the Father of Modern Egypt, being the first ruler since the Ottoman conquest in 1517 to permanently divest the Porte of its power in Egypt. While failing to achieve formal independence for Egypt during his lifetime, he was successful in laying the foundation for a modern Egyptian state.

The Founder of Independent Egypt, Saad Zaghloul (1859–1927), was a politician who served in many ministries of the Egyptian government, and was imprisoned by the British government in Malta, but returned to Egypt to participate in the revolution of 1919. Zaghloul then was able to make the Sultan of Egypt (later King) Fuad I convince the British to grant Egypt independence with a friendly British-Egyptian relationship and in 1922, Egypt was proclaimed an independent kingdom, the Kingdom of Egypt with Saad Zaghloul as its prime minister. British military presence in Egypt ended with nationalisation of Suez Canal in 1956.

=== Eswatini ===
Ngwane III was King of kaNgwane from 1745 to 1780. He is considered to be the first King of modern Eswatini.

=== Ethiopia ===
Menelik I is claimed to be first the first Emperor of Ethiopia during the 10th century B.C (975–950 B.C). Yekuno Amlak founded the Solomonic dynasty and was the first emperor of the Ethiopian Empire from 1270 to 1285 A.D. Menelik II is the founder of modern Ethiopian state.

=== Ghana ===
Kwame Nkrumah (1909–1972) led the nation to its independence from the United Kingdom in 1957.

=== Guinea ===
Ahmed Sékou Touré (var. Ahmed Seku Turay) (1922–1984) was a Guinean political leader and President of Guinea from 1958 to his death in 1984. Touré was one of the primary Guinean nationalists involved in the independence of the country from France.

He is with Kwame Nkrumah one of the founders of the African Union, and the Guinean Diallo Telli was the first general secretary of the African Union.

=== Kenya ===
Jomo Kenyatta served as the first Prime Minister (1963–1964) and President (1964–1978) of the Republic, after independence from the United Kingdom in 1963. He was the preeminent political figure for independence during the Mau Mau rebellion guerilla war for independence.

=== Liberia ===
Joseph Jenkins Roberts (1809–1876) was born a free man of African American descent. He migrated to Liberia in 1829 with his family to join thousands of other African Americans resettled from 1820 based on efforts of the American Colonization Society. In 1839, Roberts became Liberia's lieutenant governor and afterwards, its governor (1841–1848). He is known as the father of Liberia and officially declared Liberia's independence in 1847. The descendants of Roberts and the African American settlers are the Americo-Liberian people.

=== Libya ===
Idris of Libya (1889–1983) was the first and only king of Libya, reigning from 1951 to 1969, and the Chief of the Senussi Muslim order. Idris as-Senussi proclaimed an independent Emirate of Cyrenaica in 1949. He was also invited to become Emir of Tripolitania, another of the three traditional regions that now constitute modern Libya (the third being Fezzan). By accepting he began the process of uniting Libya under a single monarchy. A constitution was enacted in 1949 and adopted in October 1951. A National Congress elected Idris as King of Libya, and as Idris I he proclaimed the independence of the Kingdom of Libya as a sovereign state on 24 December 1951.

=== Mauritania ===
Moktar Ould Daddah is widely regarded as the founding father of Mauritania. He led the country to independence from France in 1960 and served as its first president from 1960 to 1978.

=== Morocco ===
The first Moroccan state was established by Idris I in 788. The 'Alawi dynasty, which rules the country to this day, was established by Sharif bin Ali in 1631.

Sultan Mohammed V, who secured Moroccan independence in 1956, declared himself the first King of Morocco in 1957.

=== Namibia ===
- Dr. Sam Shafiishuna Nujoma served as first President of Namibia from 1990 to 2005.
- Andimba Toivo ya Toivo was the iconic figure of the Namibian Liberation struggle.
- Hosea Kutako is considered by many as the Father of Namibian Nationalism.
- Hendrik Witbooi was the Nama captain who led the early resistance against Germans in the late 1800s.
- Jonker Afrikaner was the founder of the first rudimentary state in the territory of Namibia.

=== Nigeria ===
- Herbert Macaulay (1864–1946)
- Professor Eyo Ita (1903–1972)
- Alvan Ikoku (1900–1971)
- Dr. Nnamdi Azikiwe (1904–1996)
- Chief Obafemi Awolowo (1909–1987)
- Al-Haji Sir Ahmadu Bello (1910–1966)
- Al-Haji Sir Abubakar Tafawa Balewa (1912–1966) served as first Prime Minister of Nigeria from 1957 to 1966. Independence from United Kingdom was achieved in 1960.
- Chief Anthony Enahoro (1923–2010)
- Dr., Sir Egbert Udo Udoma (1917–1998)
- Al-Haji Aminu Kano (1920–1983)
- Chief S. A. Ajayi (1910–1994)
- Joseph Tarka (1932–1980)
- Dennis Osadebay (1911–1994)

All are considered founders of Nigeria. The troika of Obafemi Awolowo, Nnamdi Azikiwe, and Ahmadu Bello negotiated Nigeria's independence from Britain, aided by such figures as Chief Funmilayo Ransome-Kuti.

=== Sierra Leone ===
Freetown, Sierra Leone was founded in part by a Black American soldier, Thomas Peters in 1792, after managing to convince British abolitionists to help settle 1,192 Black Americans who fought for the British in return for freedom. Peters, alongside other Black Americans David George and Moses Wilkinson, were influential in the establishment of Freetown, but it was Peters who is remembered today as the true influential leader and founder of Sierra Leone. The descendants of Peters and the Black American founders form part of the Sierra Leone Creole or Krio ethnicity today and in 2011, a statue was erected in Freetown to honour him.

=== Senegal ===
The founder of modern Senegal is Léopold Sédar Senghor. He served as first President from 1960 to 1980.

=== Seychelles ===
James Mancham served as first President of Seychelles from 1976 to 1977. He was one of the last White African presidents in the history of Africa. He considered himself the self-proclaimed "Founding Father"; however this title is often attributed to his socialist successor France-Albert René, who led the country to become one of the most democratic and most economically stable states in Africa.

=== Somalia ===
The Somali Youth League played a major role for Somalia's independence since the 1940s, with two of its members having served as the first two Somali presidents, Aden Adde and Abdirashid Shermarke. There are several murals and monuments dedicated to the SYL's independence movement in Mogadishu.

=== Republic of Somaliland ===
Mohamed Haji Ibrahim Egal was the founder and first prime minister of Somaliland.

=== Republic of South Africa ===
Nelson Mandela (1918–2013) was the President of South Africa, in office from 1994 to 1999. He led the negotiations, together with F. W. de Klerk, to racially integrate and unite the country.

Other anti-apartheid activists include:

- Winnie Madikizela-Mandela
- Oliver Tambo
- Walter Sisulu
- Govan Mbeki
- Joe Slovo
- Ahmed Kathrada
- Raymond Mhlaba
- Robert Sobukwe
- Joe Modise
- Jacob Zuma
- Chris Hani
- Desmond Tutu

=== South Sudan ===
- John Garang was the main figure involved in spawning and leading the South Sudanese Independence Movement. Even though he did not live to see his country attain independence, he is often regarded as the "Father of the Nation".
- Salva Kiir serves as first President of South Sudan from 2011 to present.

=== Tanzania ===
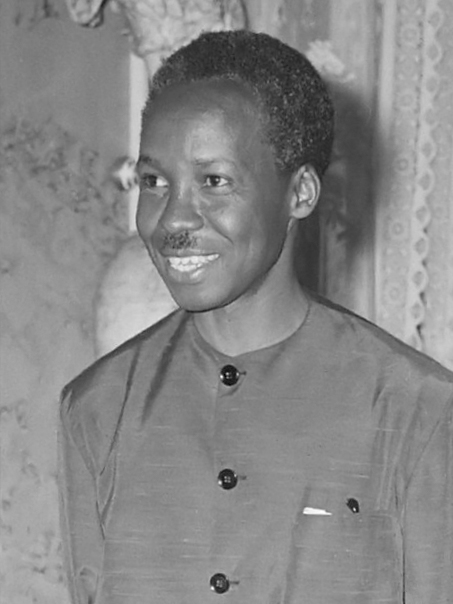
Julius Nyerere

Being the first President of Tanzania, Julius Nyerere was the main figure involved in achieving Tanzania's independence. He is often regarded as the "Father of the Nation".

=== Tunisia ===
Habib Bourguiba, considered the founder of modern Tunisia, led Tunisia to independence from France in 1956 as prime minister, then abolished its monarchy and served as the country's first President from 1957 to 1987; during his leadership, he modernized Tunisia, built schools and hospitals, and gave Tunisian women better human rights than other countries, and these rights still continue to be exercised by Tunisian women to this day.

=== Uganda ===
Milton Obote was a Ugandan political leader who led Uganda to independence from British colonial rule in 1962. Following the nation's independence, he served as prime minister of Uganda from 1962 to 1966 and the second president of Uganda from 1966 to 1971, then again from 1980 to 1985.

=== Zambia ===
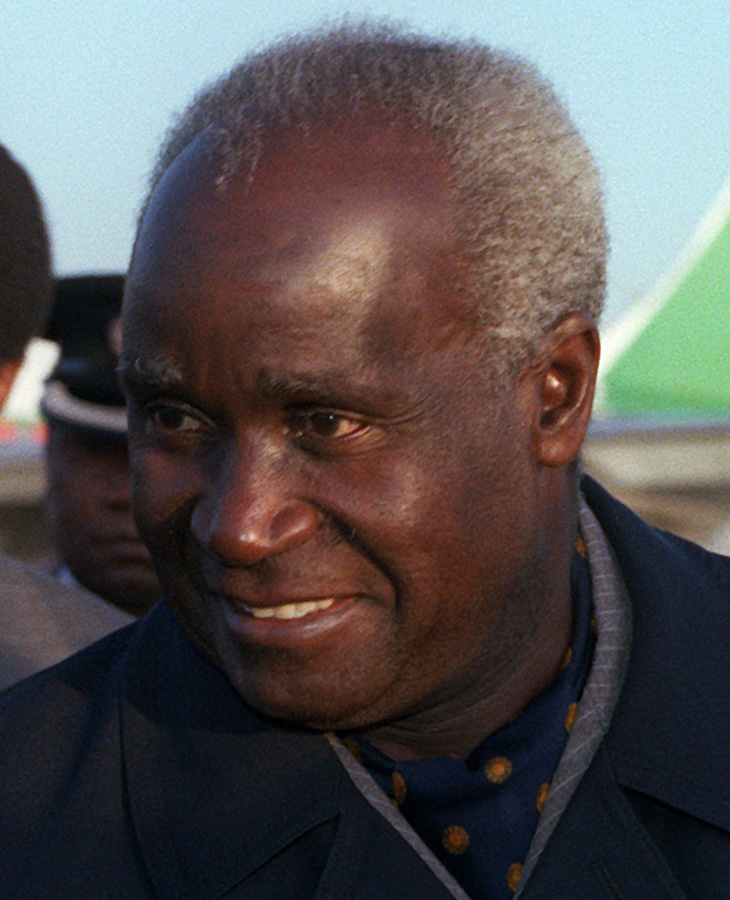
Kenneth Kaunda

Kenneth Kaunda (1924–2021) is the prominent icon in the independence and unification of Zambia. He served as first President from 1964 to 1991. However, there are important personalities like Simon Kapwepwe and Harry Nkumbula (1916–18) that fairly deserve recognition. Together, in their different capacities, they led the nation to freedom.

=== Zimbabwe ===
Abel Muzorewa (1925–2010) was the first black Prime Minister of Zimbabwe Rhodesia.
Robert Mugabe (1924–2019) was the leader of ZANU-PF (Zimbabwe African National Union – Patriotic Front), who ruled Zimbabwe from 1980 to 2017.
Others

- Rekayi Tangwena
- Tichafa Samuel Parirenyatwa
- Joshua Nkomo
- Leopold Takawira
- Simon Muzenda
- Ndabaningi Sithole
- Herbert Chitepo
- Josiah Tongogara
- Enos Nkala
- Edgar Tekere
- George Nyandoro
- James Chikerema
- Solomon Mujuru
- Alfred Nikita Mangena
- Josiah Tungamirai
- Jason Ziyaphapha Moyo
- George Silundika
- Dumiso Dabengwa
- Lookout Masuku

== Americas ==
=== Argentina ===
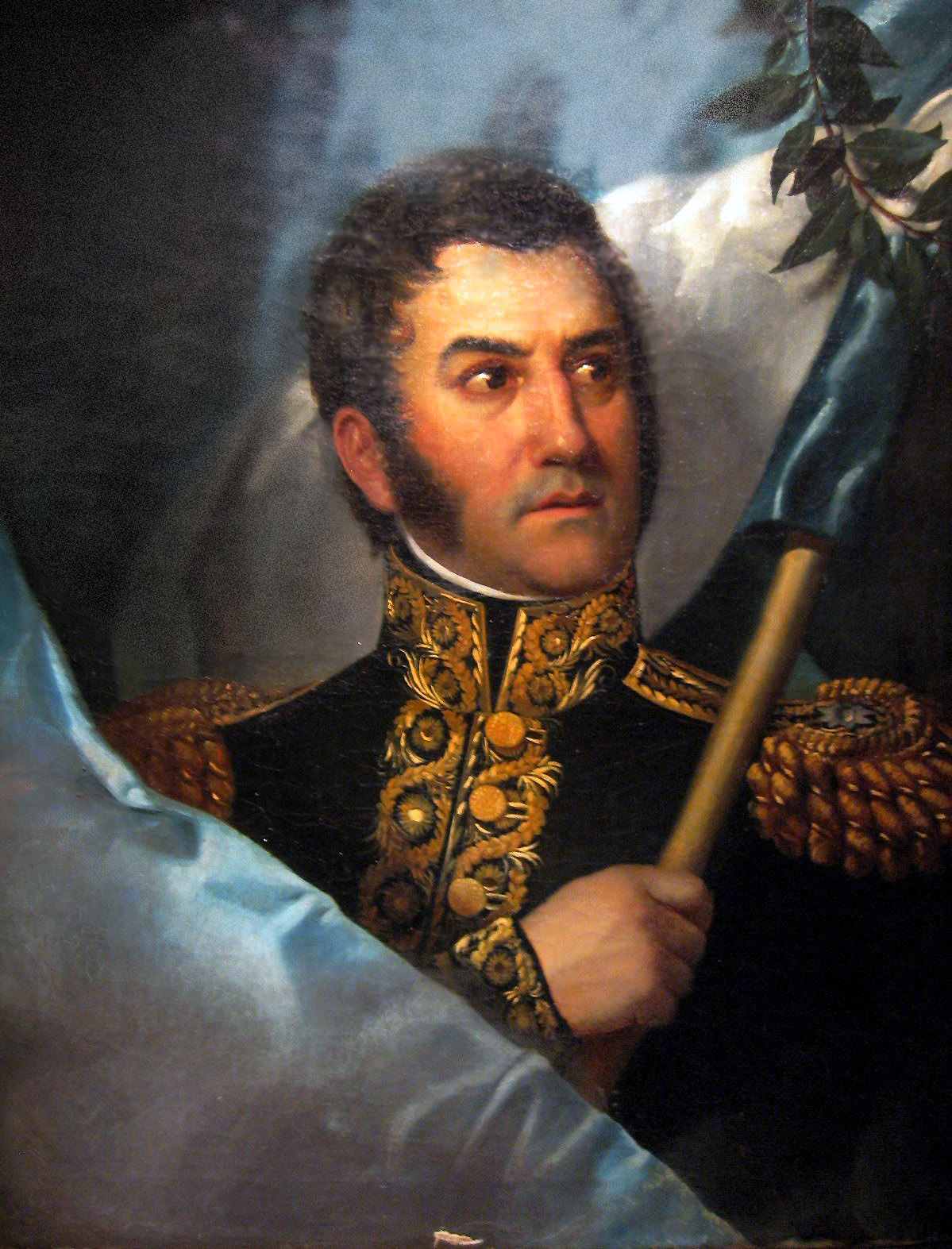
The Argentine military commander José de San Martín is known as the "Liberator of Argentina, Chile and Peru".

The military commander José de San Martín was one of the most important figures of the War of Independence (1810–1818) in Argentina, where he is known as the "Father of the Homeland" (Spanish: Padre de la Patria) and the date of his death (or "Passage to Immortality"; "Pasaje a la Inmortalidad in Spanish) is commemorated as a national holiday. One of the main libertadores of the Spanish American wars of independence, San Martín played a crucial role in the expulsion of royalist forces not only from Argentina but also from Chile and Peru, where he is thus also celebrated as a national hero. One of his most celebrated feats is the 1817 Crossing of the Andes, when he crossed the mountain range from present-day Argentina to present-day Chile, in a surprise attack on royalist forces.

Manuel Belgrano, another important leader of the War of Independence and creator of the flag of Argentina, is also widely regarded as a national hero.

María Remedios del Valle, an Afro-Argentine camp follower turned soldier who participated in the War of Independence, is regarded as the "Mother of the Homeland" (Spanish: Madre de la Patria).

=== Bahamas ===
Lynden Pindling is considered the "Father of the Nation". He served as first Prime Minister of the Bahamas from 1967 to 1992. Independence from United Kingdom was achieved in 1973.

=== Barbados ===
Errol Barrow (1920–1987) is often referred to as the Father of Independence of Barbados. Initially a World War II pilot and then a lawyer, he founded the Democratic Labour Party in 1955 after defecting from the Barbados Labour Party. He served as the third and final premier of Barbados (serving from 1961 to 1966) and lead Barbados to independence from the British Empire in 1966. He became the country's first prime minister and served two terms (1966–1976 and 1986–1987) and died in office from illness in 1987.

=== Belize ===
George Cadle Price (1919–2011) is considered to be the Father of the Nation of Belize. He served as head of government of British Honduras, later Belize from 1961 to 1984. Independence from United Kingdom was achieved in 1981.

=== Bolivia ===
Simón Bolívar (1783–1830) and Antonio José de Sucre (1795–1830) are considered to be the founders of Bolivia.

=== Brazil ===
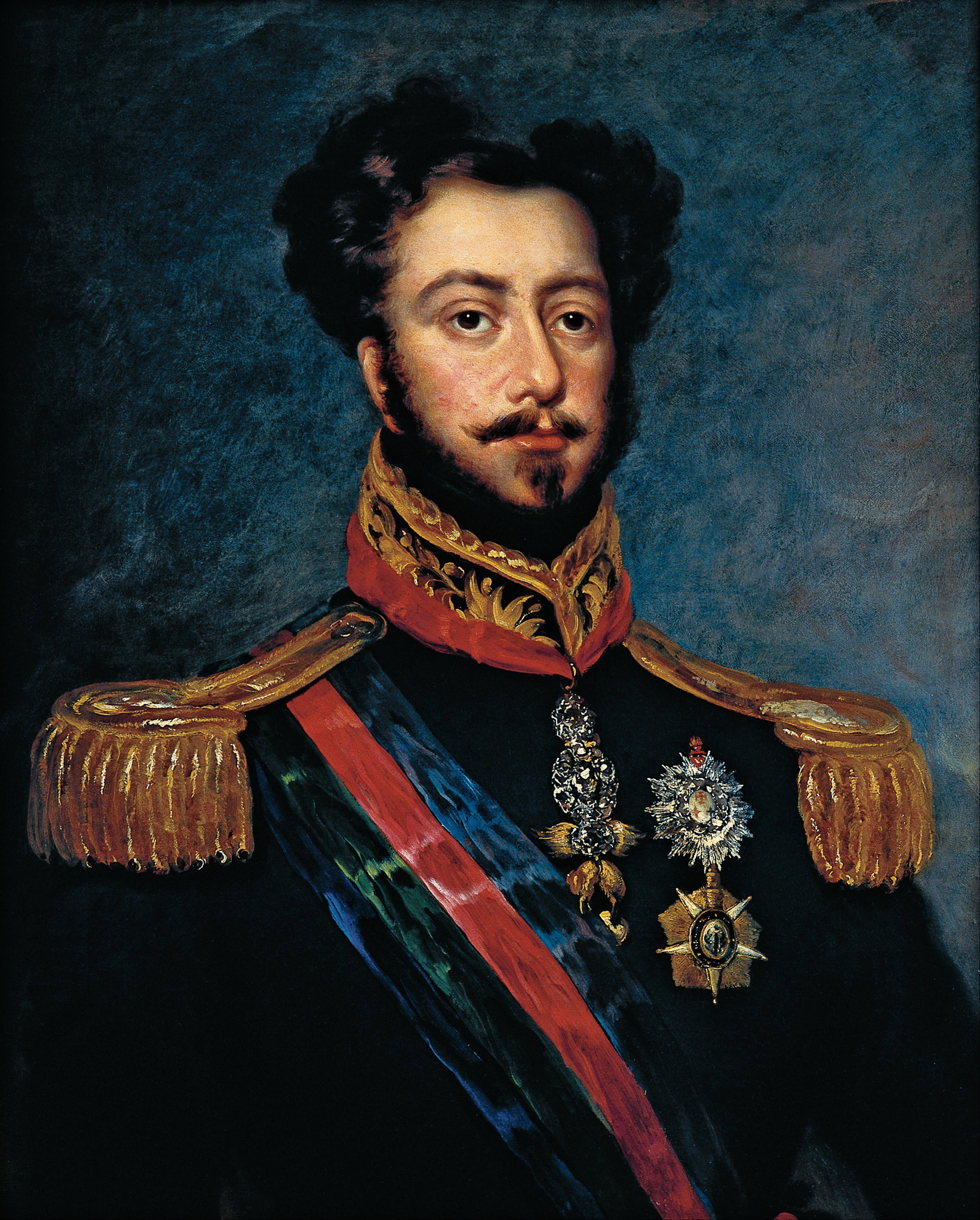
Pedro I, founder and first ruler of the Empire of Brazil

Pedro Álvares Cabral (1467/68–1520) commander of the first Portuguese fleet to arrive in South America.

José Bonifácio de Andrada (1763–1838), known as "Patriarch of Independence", is considered the primary leader of the independence movement because of his intellectual mentorship and political prominence, and Pedro I of Brazil (1798–1834), son of the King João VI of Portugal, the symbol of the "center of force and union", according to the Bonifácio strategy.

=== Canada ===
The name "Fathers of Confederation" is given to those who attended the Charlottetown and Quebec Conferences in 1864, and the London Conference of 1866, to establish the Canadian Confederation. There were 36 original Fathers of Confederation.

Queen Victoria, who supported and encouraged this process, is known as the Mother of Confederation. She was the first Monarch under the 1867 Constitution and personally chose Ottawa as Canada's capital city. The political leaders who brought the other provinces into Confederation after 1867 are also referred to as "Fathers of Confederation".

=== Caribbean Community ===
Errol Barrow (Barbados: 1920–1987); Forbes Burnham (Guyana: 1923–1985); Michael Manley (Jamaica: 1924–1997); and Eric Williams (Trinidad and Tobago: 1911–1981) were the leaders who brought forth regional integration among the Caribbean Community.

=== Chile ===
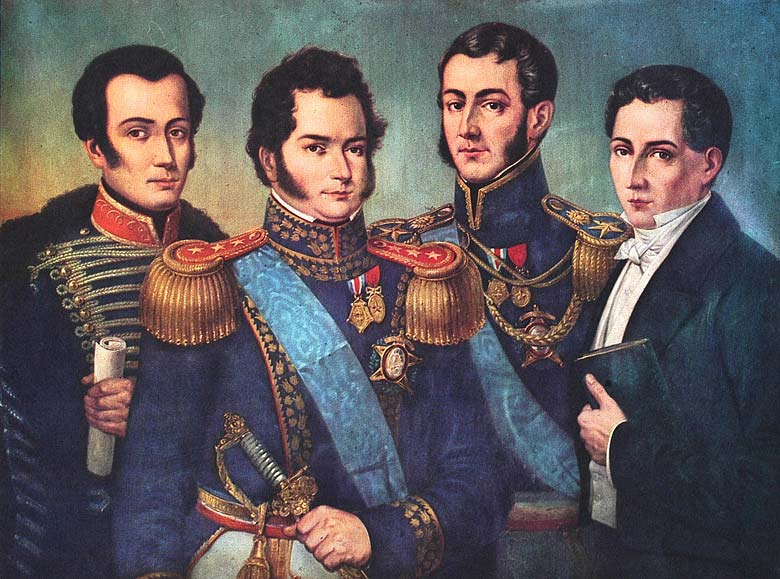
Posthumous (1854) portrait of the Founding Fathers of the Chilean Republic. From left to right: José Miguel Carrera, Bernardo O'Higgins, José de San Martín, Diego Portales

Bernardo O'Higgins (1778–1842) and José Miguel Carrera (1785–1821) are usually considered the founders of Chile. Diego Portales (1793–1837) is sometimes considered due to his influence in the 1833 Constitution.

=== Colombia ===
Simón Bolívar, was founder of Gran Colombia, which also included Panama, Ecuador, and Venezuela. Francisco de Paula Santander wrote the first constitution of Colombia. Antonio Nariño ("Precursor of the Independence") and Camilo Torres were the most relevant statesmen of the First Republic.

=== Costa Rica ===
Juan Mora Fernández, first Head of State of Costa Rica. José María Castro Madriz, First President of the Republic and proclaimed "Founder of the Republic" by Congress Juan Rafael Mora Porras, President during Costa Rica's campaign against William Walker, proclaimed "Hero and Liberator" by Congress.

=== Cuba ===
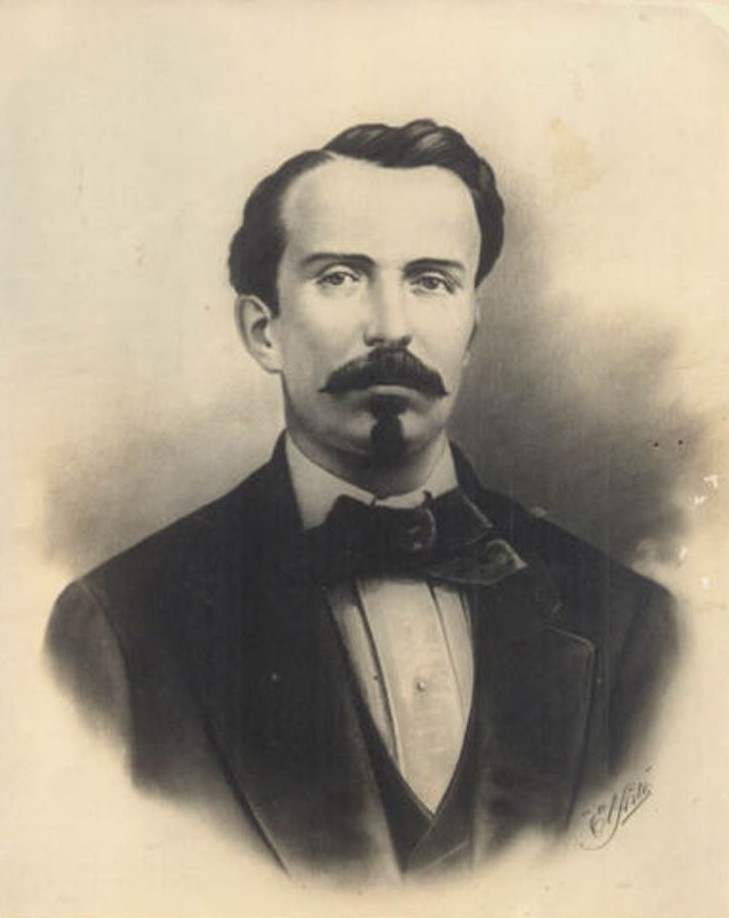
Carlos Manuel de Céspedes, the primary leader in Cuba's fight for independence.

Carlos Manuel de Céspedes (1819–1874) is considered the Cuban Founding Father. In 1868, he freed his slaves and declared the independence of Cuba, which began the Ten Years' War (1868–1878).

José Martí is a Cuban national hero.

Modern day Cuba was shaped by Fidel Castro with help from Che Guevara during the Cuban Revolution.

=== Dominican Republic ===
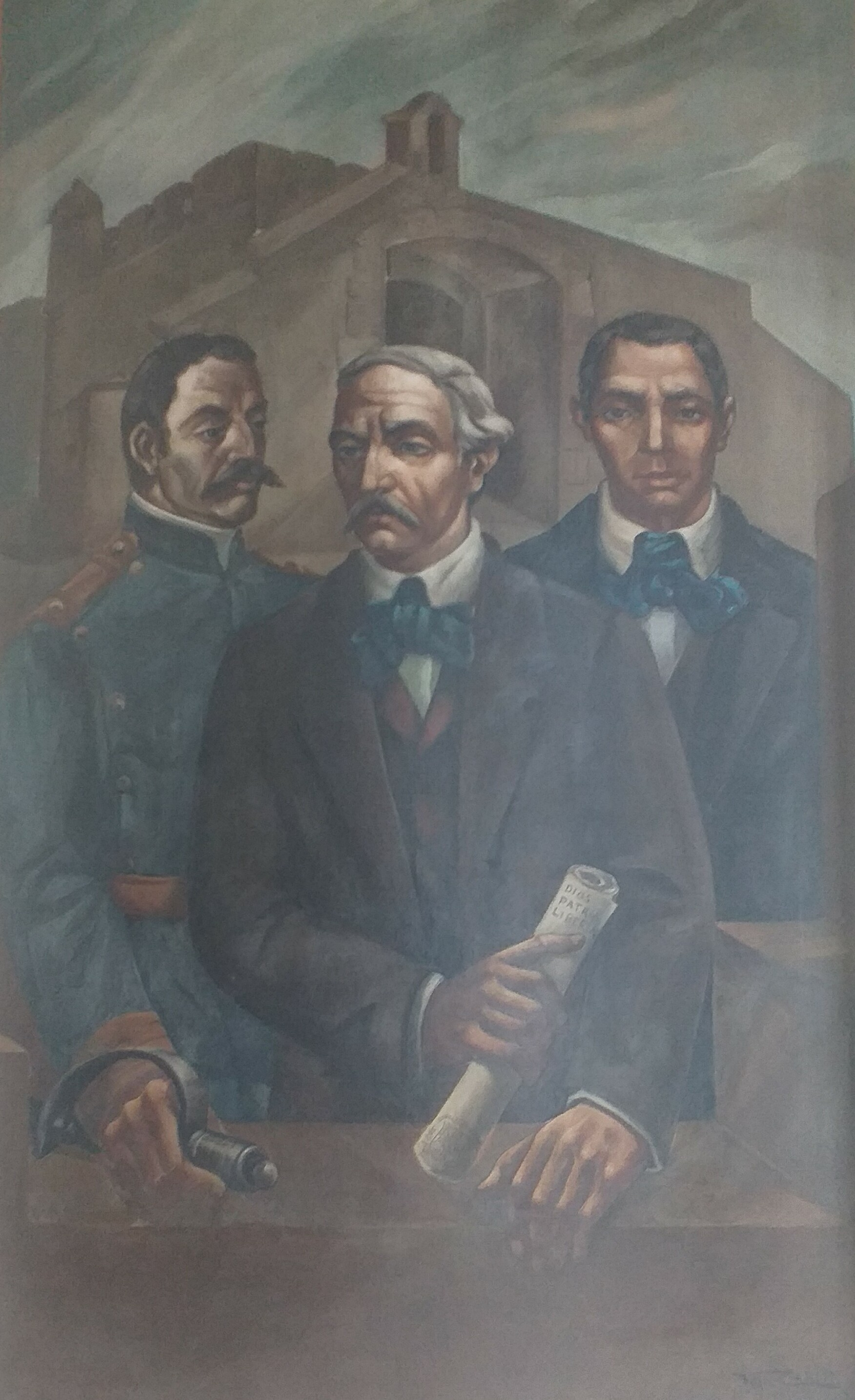
The key architects of Dominican independence: Matías Ramón Mella, Juan Pablo Duarte and Francisco del Rosario Sánchez.

Matías Ramón Mella (1816–1864), Juan Pablo Duarte (1813–1876) and Francisco del Rosario Sánchez (1817–1861) are considered the Dominican Republic's Founding Fathers. Duarte is featured on the $1 coin and on the now discontinued $1 bill; Sanchez on the $5 coin and on the also discontinued $5 bill; Mella on the $10 coin and on the also discontinued $10 bill.

Gregorio Luperón, a prominent figure of the Dominican Restoration War, is also a national hero.

=== Ecuador ===
In Ecuadorian historiography, the term Próceres refers to founding fathers of the republic, both military heroes and those who built the initial republic.

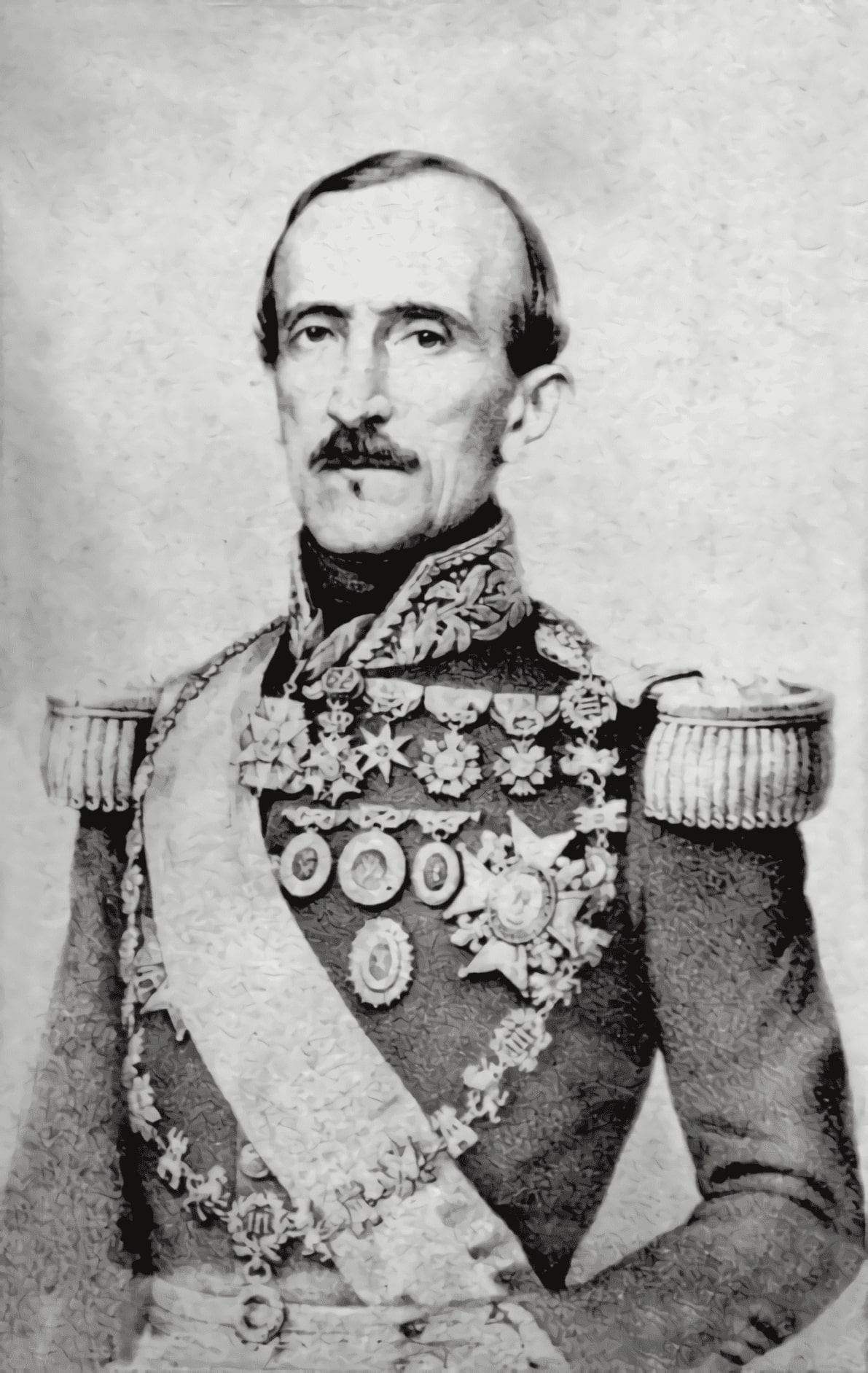
Founding father of Ecuador and first President Juan Jose Flores

Juan José Flores was the central executive figure in Ecuador's separation from Gran Colombia in 1830 and became the republic's first president. As a Gran Colombian general commanding forces in the southern district, he controlled the military apparatus necessary to make separation viable. He presided over the Constituent Assembly of Riobamba and oversaw the first constitution. His government established the initial administrative, fiscal, and territorial framework of the state. Though often authoritarian and military-dominant, his role in physically consolidating Ecuador as a sovereign republic makes him the primary structural founder.

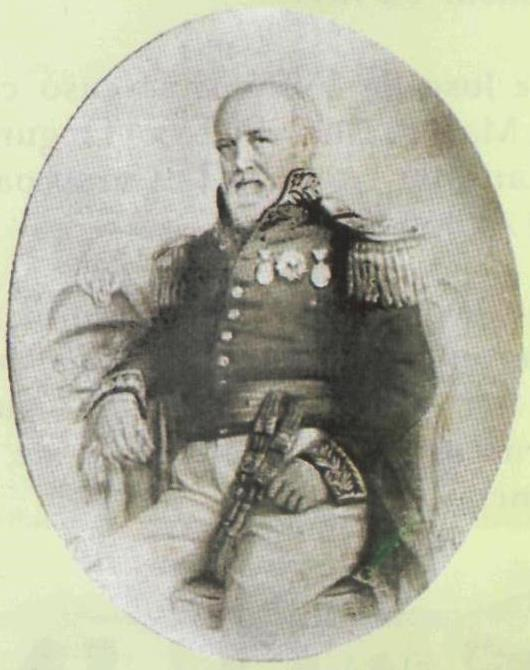
General José de Villamil, founding father of Ecuador

José de Villamil helped organize Guayaquil's 1820 declaration of independence and later served in administrative and diplomatic roles in the republic. He was the Governor of Guayas and also captured and governed the Galápagos Islands. Villamil participated in diplomatic efforts aimed at securing foreign recognition for the new state. He contributed to consolidating coastal governance within the early republican framework.

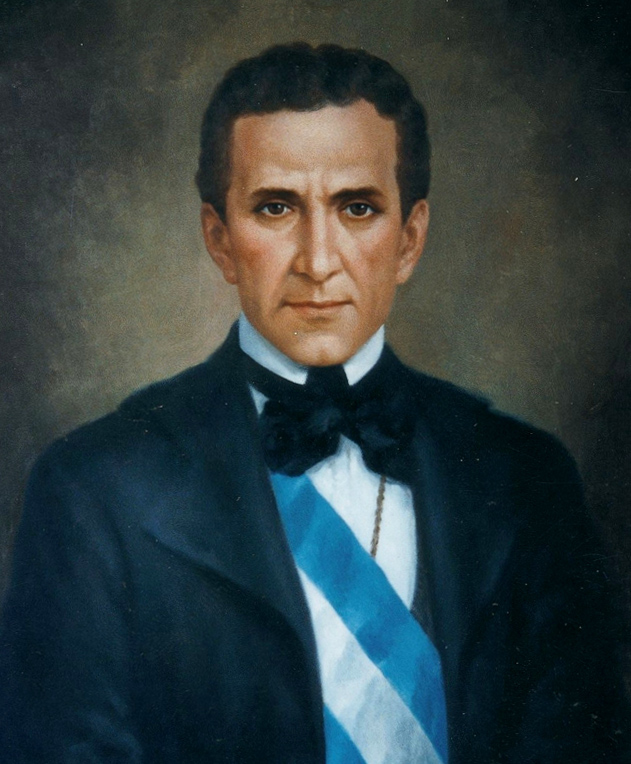
Founding father Olmedo

Jose Joaquin Olmedo was the first vice president of Ecuador and fifth president of Ecuador, he was the leader of Guayaquil's 1820 independence movement and remained influential during the formation of the republic. His leadership ensured Guayaquil's incorporation into the Ecuadorian state after the Gran Colombian period. Though not a military commander, he was a key civil authority bridging independence and republican structuring. His role anchored regional integration within the early republic.

Vicente Rocafuerte served as second president of the republic, serving from 1835 to 1839. He stabilized the republic after Flores's first administrations. His presidency marked the first meaningful transition from a purely military founding authority to structured civil administration. He is widely considered the foundational institutional consolidator and by some even the "first" Ecuadorian president.

Vicente Ramón Roca was the third president of Ecuador, and led the March Revolution of 1845 that removed Flores from the presidency. As president (1845–1849), he consolidated civilian political leadership and strengthened commercial and administrative governance. Roca represents the second consolidation phase of the founding generation. He was the first president not to come from aristocracy or be of noble background and was a Spanish entrepreneur and businessman.

John Illingworth Hunt, originally a British naval officer, supported the 1820 independence movement in Guayaquil as leader and was the founder of the Gran Colombian navy, and later held provincial and legislative roles in the new republic. He served as Governor of Guayas and participated in national political life, including legislative functions. He helped with the consolidation and continuity of administration.

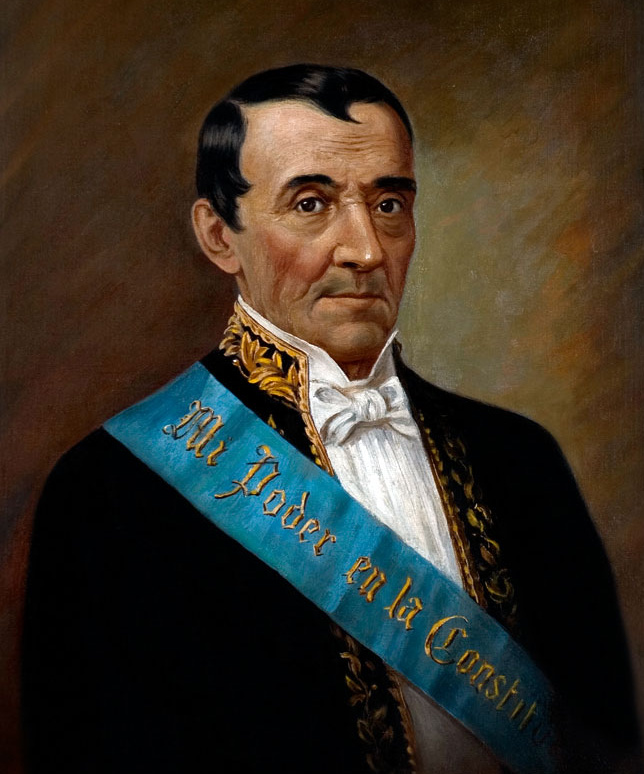
Diego Noboa Arteta

Diego Noboa was a central leader in the 1820 revolution and one of the original drafters of the constitution, he later participated in the 1845 March Revolution. He represented the commercial elite's interests in national politics. He contributed to redefining early constitutional legitimacy during one of the republic's first major power resets.

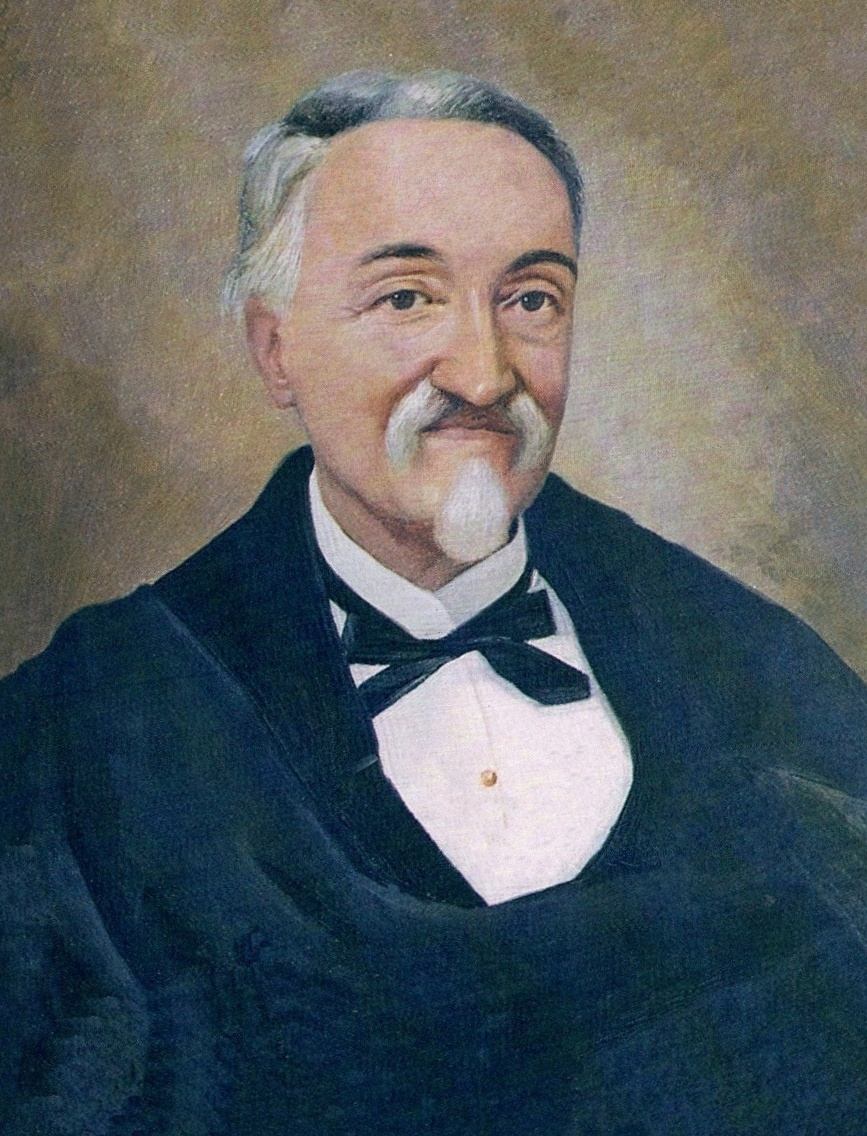
Manuel de Ascásubi

Manuel de Ascásubi was a key figure, coming from a marquisate and count noble houses. He along with his father where key figures in the funding of the revolution if 1820, he later held executive and legislative roles during unstable transitional periods in the early republic, including acting as interim head of state and later president. He operated within constitutional frameworks to preserve governmental functionality amid factional dispute.

=== El Salvador ===
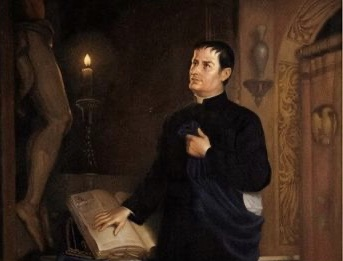
José Matías Delgado was a Salvadoran priest and doctor known as El Padre de la Patria Salvadoreña (The Father of the Salvadoran Fatherland).

José Matías Delgado is considered to be the "Father of the Salvadoran Fatherland".

=== Guatemala ===
In 1523, Pedro de Alvarado, a member of Hernán Cortés' group that conquered Mexico, was sent to conquer the area of land below Mexico that is known today as Guatemala.

=== Haiti ===
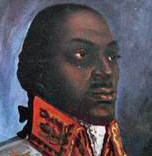
Toussaint Louverture of Haiti

Toussaint Louverture (1743–1803) and Jean-Jacques Dessalines (1758–1806) were revolutionary and early political leaders of Haiti. Henri Christophe and Alexandre Pétion were also important figures of early Haiti.

=== Honduras ===
Founders of the Honduran Nation are José Cecilio del Valle (1777–1834), Dionisio de Herrera (1781–1850), Francisco Morazán (1792–1842), José Trinidad Reyes (1797–1855), and José Trinidad Cabañas (1805–1871).

=== Jamaica ===
Norman Manley is particularly noted for his role in securing universal suffrage for the country's population in 1944 along with founding the People's National Party. Manley also served as Chief Minister of Jamaica from 1955 to 1962. Alexander Bustamante was an influential union leader and as founder of the Jamaican Labour Party. Bustamante served as the then colony's first Chief Minister from 1953 to 1955 and later went on to lead Jamaica to independence from the United Kingdom in 1962, becoming the country's first Prime Minister.

=== Mexico ===
According to the decrees of the Congress of the Union of Mexico issued in 1822 and 1823, the Mexican founders are Miguel Hidalgo y Costilla (1753–1811), Ignacio Allende (1769–1811), Juan Aldama (1774–1811), Mariano Abasolo (1783–1816), José María Morelos (1765–1815), Mariano Matamoros (1770–1814), Leonardo Bravo (1764–1812), Miguel Bravo (unknown–1814), Hermenegildo Galeana (1762–1814), Mariano Jiménez (1781–1811), Xavier Mina (1789–1817), Pedro Moreno (1775–1817), and Víctor Rosales (1776–1817).

Nine of the thirteen founders are buried in the Monument to Independence in Mexico City.

=== Nicaragua ===
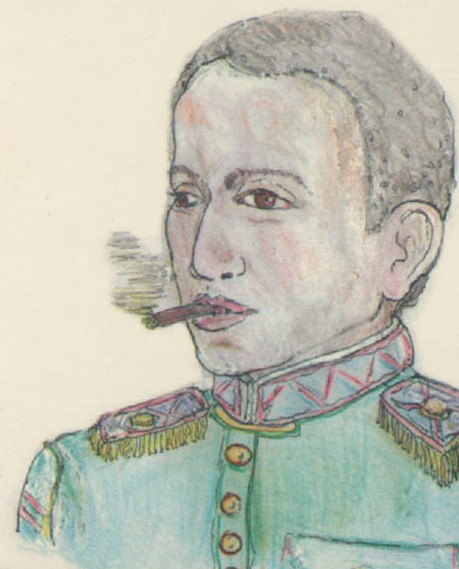
José Anacleto Ordóñez, "First Popular Caudillo of Nicaragua"

José Anacleto Ordóñez (1778–1839) is recognised as the "First Popular Caudillo of Nicaragua", as he led the state to independence by revolting against the pro Mexican government in 1823. Later he served as Head of State of Nicaragua within the Federal Republic of Central America.

José Núñez (1800–1880) and Joaquín del Cossío (1789–unknown) were the most important figures in Nicaragua's Independence, as they started the first and second transitional governments that declared to the State's Independence from the FRCA in 1838.

Fruto Chamorro (1804–1855) is considered as "Founder of the Republic", as he initiated the 1854 Constitution which formally declared Nicaragua a Republic.

=== Panama ===
The first Spanish settlement in Panama was made in 1510. Then on 25 September 1513, Vasco Nunez de Balboa became the first European to see the Pacific Ocean (which he called the South Sea and which he claimed for Spain). Then in 1519 Pedro Arias de Avila founded Panama City.

=== Paraguay ===
José Gaspár Rodríguez de Francia is considered the founder of Paraguay. He was named perpetual dictator as of the country's formation. Although he was the one that ended up ruling the country, Rodríguez de Francia was not the only prócer of the 1811 revolution, others include: Fulgencio Yegros, Pedro Juan Caballero, Fernando de la Mora, Mauricio José Troche and Vicente Ignacio Iturbe. Yegros also served as consul alongside Francia, shortly before being deposed by him.

General Andrés Rodríguez was the first democratically elected president of Paraguay, shortly after leading the 1989 coup that ended Alfredo Stroessner's dictatorship. This is why he is often considered the father of modern Paraguay.

=== Peru ===
José de San Martín and Simón Bolívar led Peru to independence and forged the country.

=== South America ===
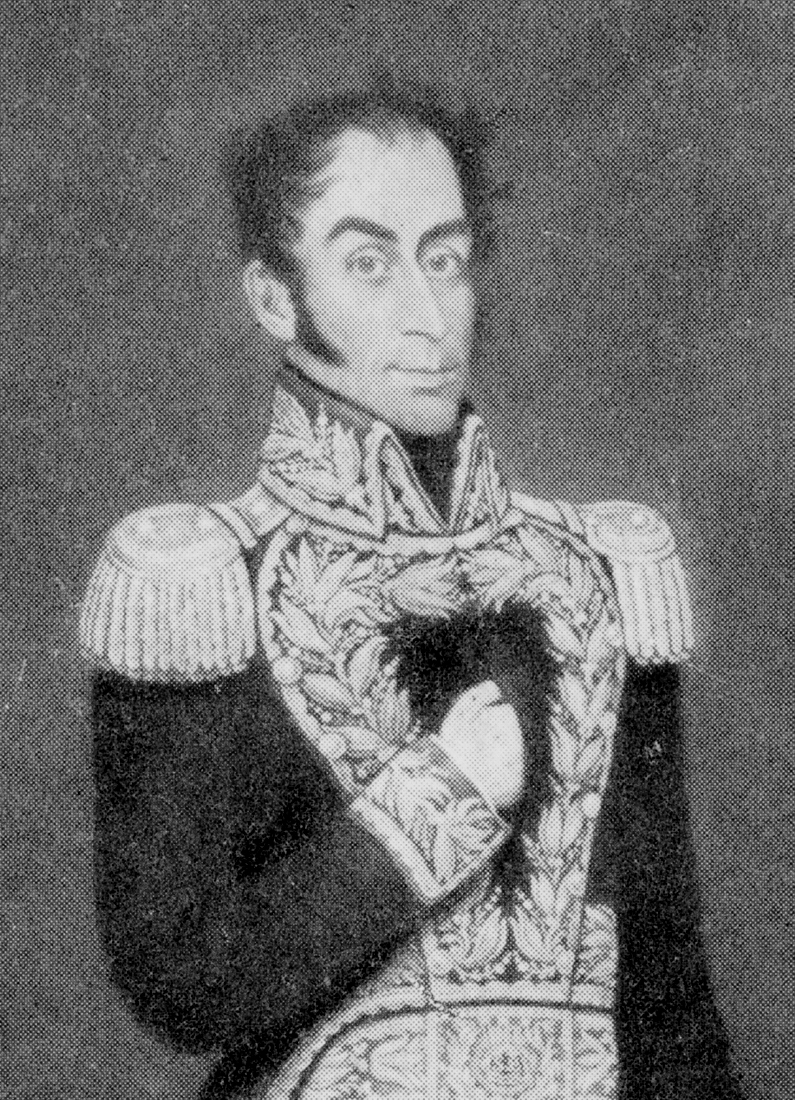
Simón Bolívar of Venezuela

José de San Martín, Simón Bolívar, Antonio José de Sucre, Francisco de Paula Santander, Francisco de Miranda have been referred to as the founding fathers of the region comprising modern day Argentina, Chile, Venezuela, Colombia, Peru, Ecuador, Bolivia and Panama.

=== Uruguay ===
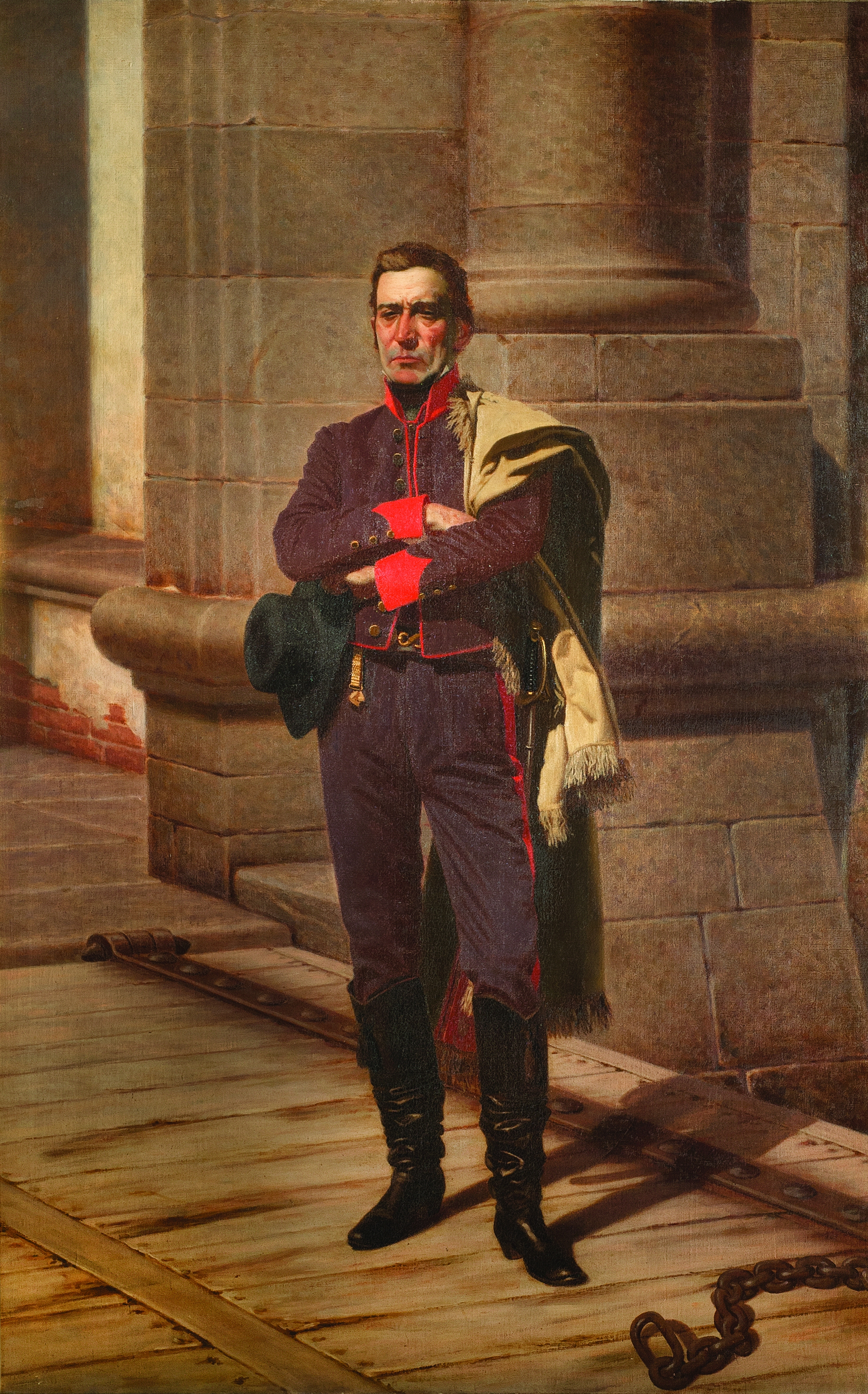
José Artigas, national hero of Uruguay.

José Gervasio Artigas is considered to be the founder of Uruguay. He was a staunch democrat and federalist, opposed to monarchism and centralism.

=== United States ===
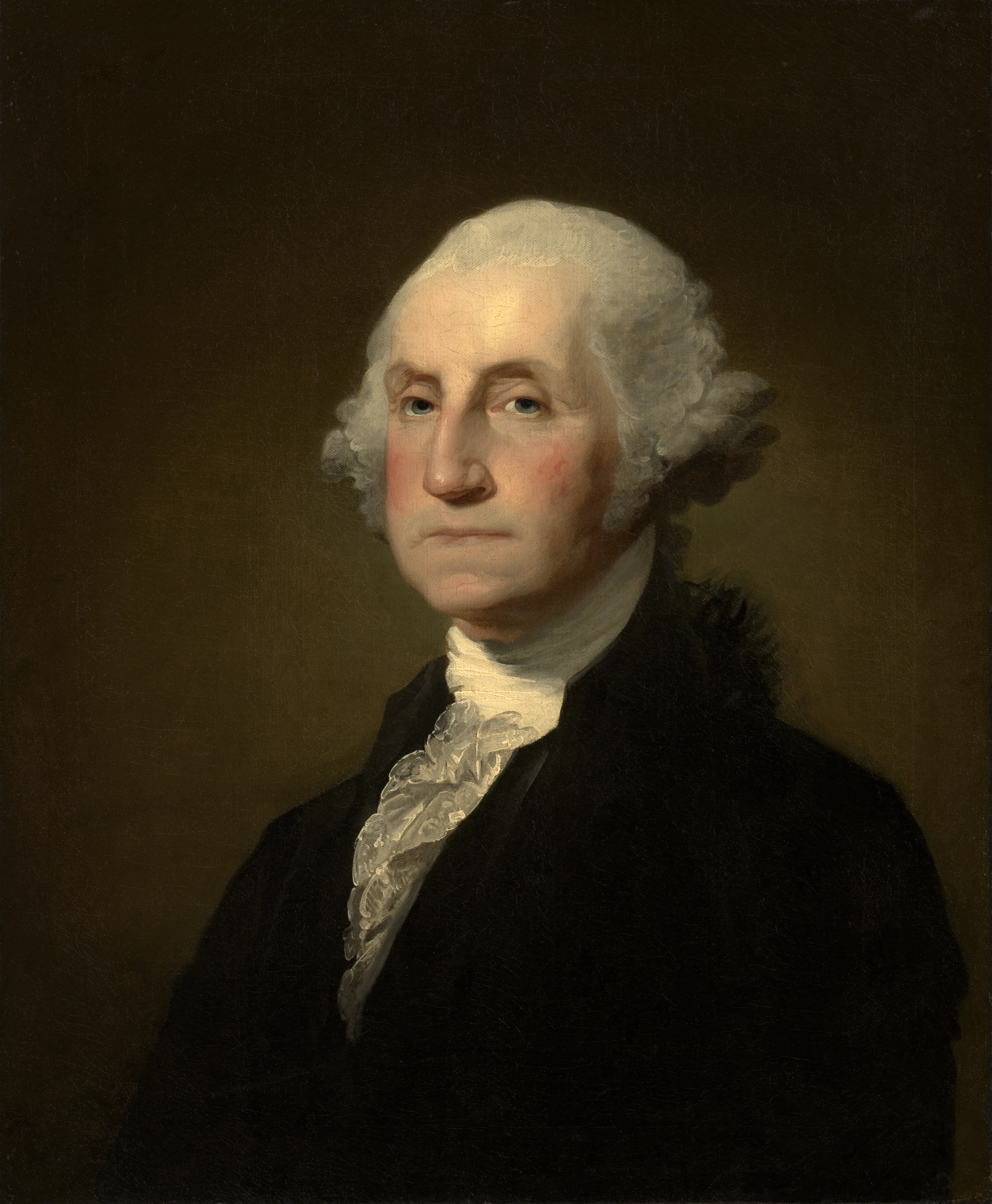
George Washington, chief among the founders of the United States, called "the Father of his country" (Pater Patriae)

The single person most identified as "Father" of the United States is George Washington, a general in the American Revolution and the first President of the United States. Washington was part of a larger group of revolutionaries known as the "Founding Fathers". Within the Founding Fathers, there are two key subsets, the Signers (who signed the Declaration of Independence in 1776) and the Framers (who were delegates to the Federal Convention and took part in framing or drafting the proposed Constitution of the United States). Some historians have suggested a revised definition of the "Founding Fathers", including a significantly broader group of not only the Signers and the Framers but also all those who, whether as politicians, jurists, statesmen, soldiers, diplomats, and ordinary citizens took part in winning U.S. independence and creating the United States of America.

American historian Richard B. Morris, in his 1973 book Seven Who Shaped Our Destiny: The Founding Fathers as Revolutionaries, identified the following seven figures as the key founders: John Adams, Benjamin Franklin, Alexander Hamilton, John Jay, Thomas Jefferson, James Madison, and Washington.

=== Venezuela ===
Simón Bolívar (1783–1830) is considered to be the founder not only of Venezuela, but of many of the region's countries as the Gran Colombia, which also included Panama, Ecuador, and Colombia. José Antonio Páez led the separation of Venezuela from the Gran Colombia and formed the modern statehood of the country. Scholars credit president Rómulo Betancourt as the founding father of modern democratic Venezuela, and Hugo Chávez as the founding father of modern democratic-dictatorship Venezuela.

== Asia ==
=== Afghanistan ===
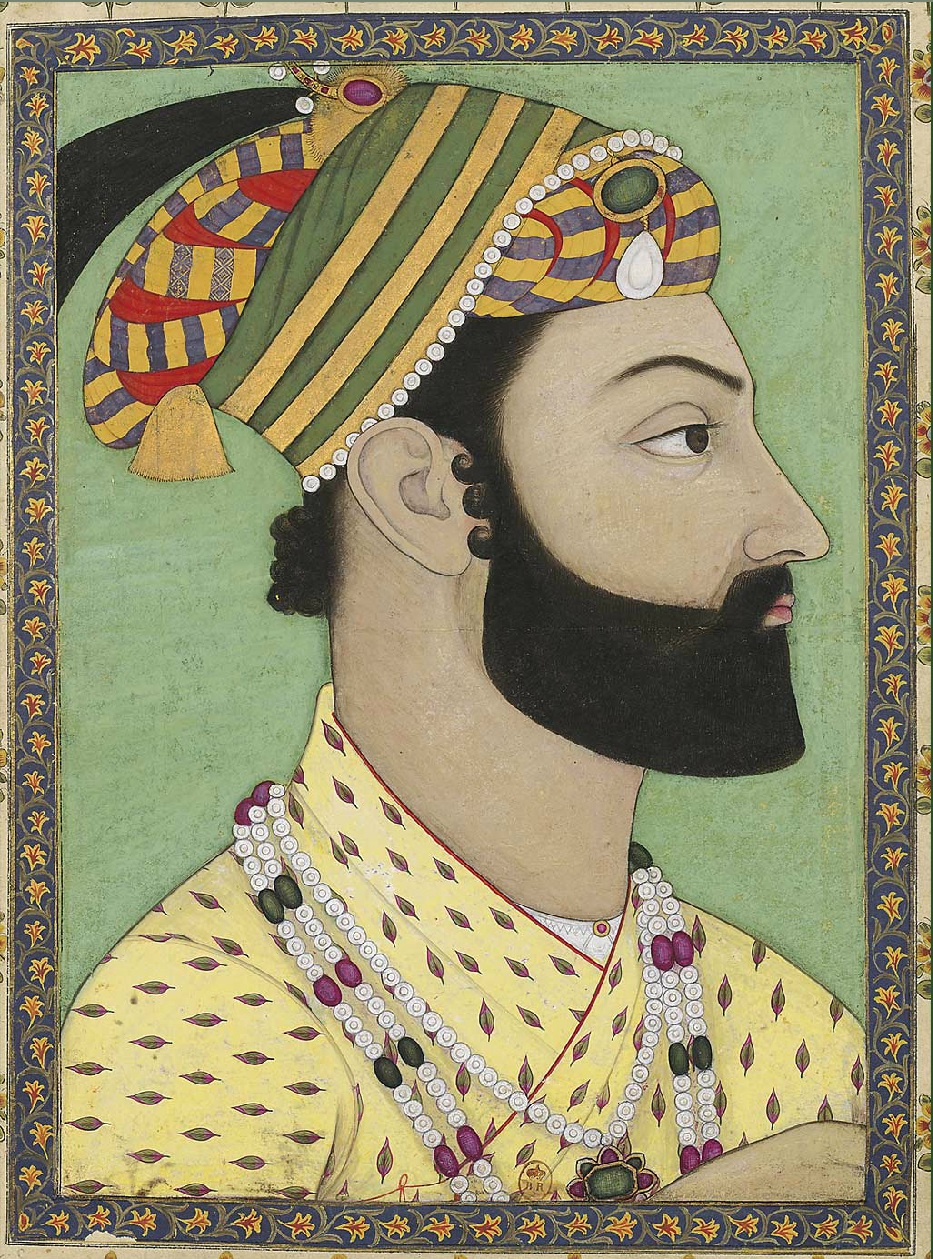
Ahmad Shah Durrani, founder of Afghanistan

Ahmad Shah Durrani (1723–1773) unified the Afghan tribes and founded Afghanistan in 1747. His mausoleum is next to the Shrine of the Cloak in Kandahar, Afghanistan, where he is fondly known as Ahmad Shah Baba (Ahmad Shah the Father).

However, the founding father of modern Afghanistan is Mohammad Zahir Shah, the last King of Afghanistan. Due to this, the Afghan parliament gave him the title of "Father of the Nation".

=== Armenia ===
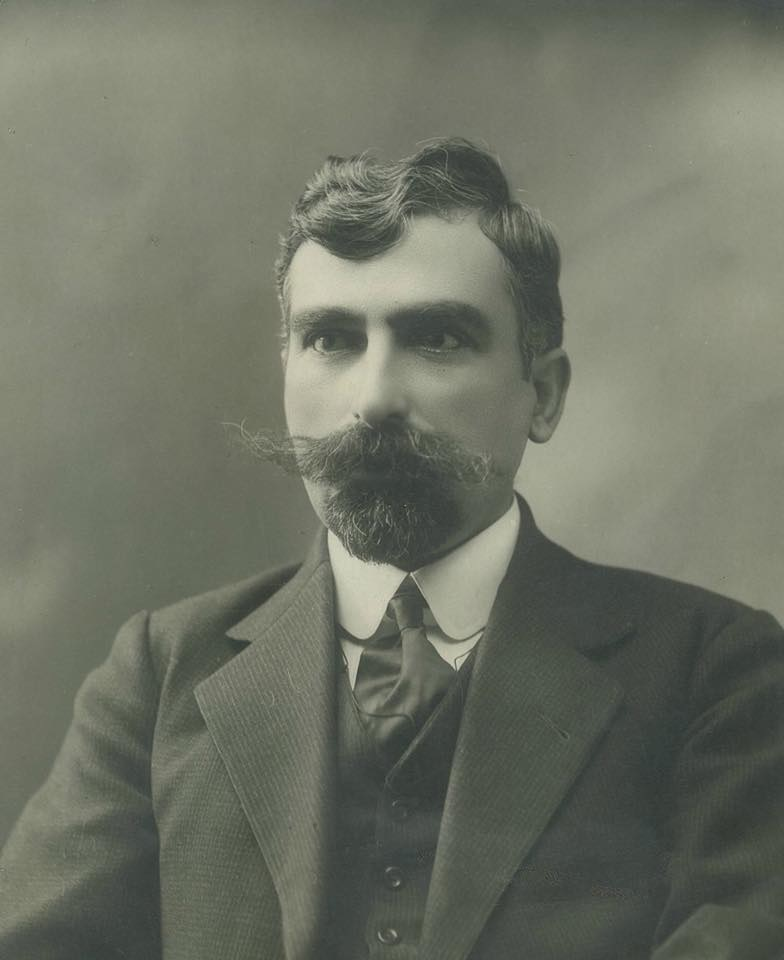
Aram Manukian is regarded as the founder of First Republic of Armenia

- Hayk Nahapet is considered the traditional founder of Armenia, providing its Armenian name: Hayk or Hayastan. Sometimes he is described as the ancestor of all Armenians. Movses Khorenatsi's 5th to 8th century book History of Armenia says that he led his people in battle to gain their independence from the Neo Assyrian Empire and Nimrod in 2492 BC. He then established Armenia as a home for his people around Lake Van.
- Aram Manukian is considered the founder of the First Republic of Armenia.

=== Azerbaijan ===
Mammad Amin Rasulzade (Azerbaijani: Məhəmməd Əmin Axund Hacı Molla Ələkbər oğlu Rəsulzadə, Turkish: Mehmed Emin Resulzâde; (1884–1955) was an Azerbaijani statesman, scholar, public figure and one of the founding political leaders of Azerbaijan Republic (1918–1920). His expression "Bir kərə yüksələn bayraq, bir daha enməz!" ("The flag once raised will never fall!") became the motto of the independence movement in Azerbaijan in the 20th century.

=== Bangladesh ===
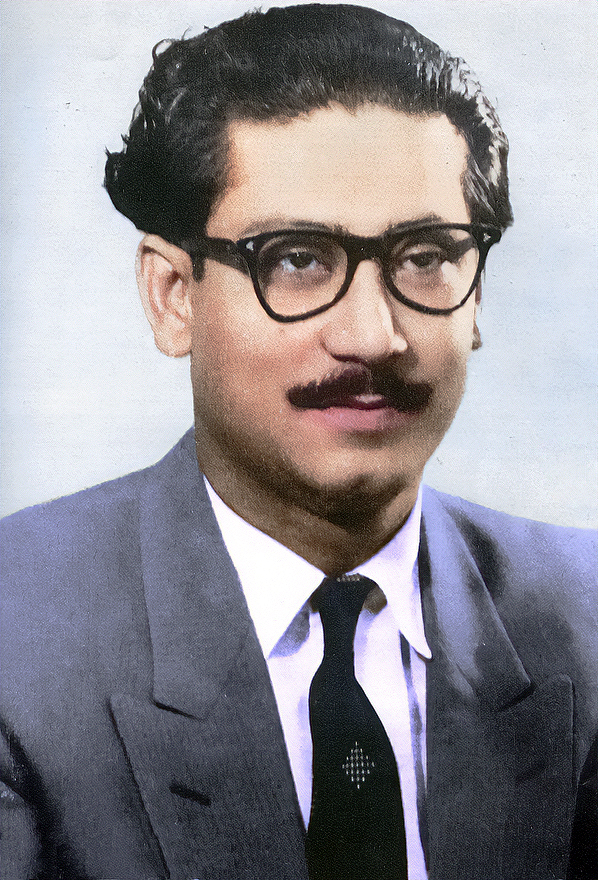
Sheikh Mujibur Rahman is considered by many as the founding father of Bangladesh

- The first Sultan of Bengal, Shamsuddin Ilyas Shah, is often credited for unifying the Bengal region (which he named Bangalah) under a single politico-social and linguistic identity (Bangali people) in 1352.
- Sheikh Mujibur Rahman, known with the honorary title Bangabandhu, is considered by many as the founding father of Bangladesh. He led Bengali nation to the decade long struggle for independence against then autocratic rule of Pakistan, finally resulting in the Bangladesh Liberation War and the independence of Bangladesh in 1971. The Constitution of Bangladesh 1972 gave him the title of "Father of the Nation".
- Abul Kasem Fazlul Huq, Huseyn Shaheed Suhrawardy and Abdul Hamid Khan Bhashani are considered as three primary founders of Bangladesh, who shaped the Bengali nationalism since the days of British rule.

Apart from the founding leaders, the four key members of the Liberation Wartime government vice-president Syed Nazrul Islam, prime minister Tajuddin Ahmad, finance minister Muhammad Mansur Ali and home minister Abul Hasnat Muhammad Qamaruzzaman (altogether known as 'Four National Leaders') and the Liberation Wartime armed forces chief Muhammad Ataul Gani Osmani are hailed as vital figures in Bangladesh's independence.

=== Bhutan ===
Ngawang Namgyal (1594–1651) fled Tibet and unified the fiefdoms of Bhutan. He established the dual system of shared power between secular and Buddhist leadership that continues as a tradition to the present.

=== Brunei ===
According to local historiography, the country of Brunei was founded by Awang Alak Betatar, later to be Sultan Muhammad Shah, reigning around AD 1400.

=== Cambodia ===
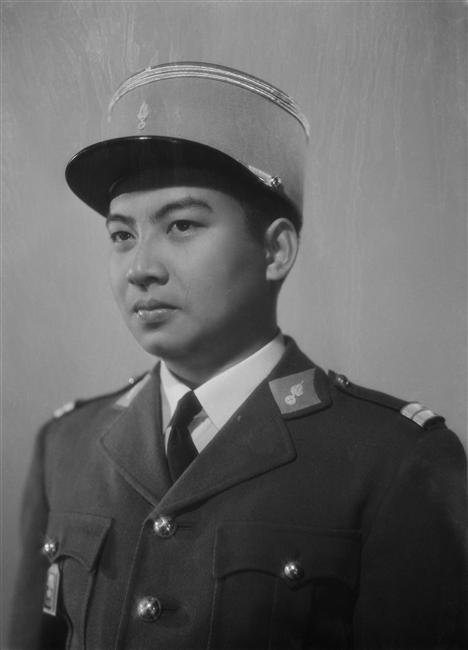
Norodom Sihanouk of Cambodia

Kaundinya I was the founder of ancient Khmer kingdom of Funan.

Jayavarman II (770–850) was the founder of the Khmer Empire.

Norodom Sihanouk (1922–2012) declared Cambodia's independence from France in 1953 and is regarded as the nation's founding father.

=== China ===
Chinese political tradition distinguishes a legendary origin of civilization, the creation of a unified empire in 221 BC, and two rival twentieth-century states that both claim continuity with that history: the Republic of China (1912) and the People's Republic of China (1949). There is no single founder comparable to a modern constitutional assembly. The figures below are those most often treated as founders of Chinese civilization, of imperial unity, or of one of the two existing Chinese republics. Later emperors founded dynasties rather than China itself. The two exceptions usually admitted into a history of Chinese statehood are the Sui reunification after the Age of Division and the Ming restoration after Mongol rule.

The Yellow Emperor (Huangdi) is the central culture hero of later Chinese origin myths. Traditional chronology placed his reign in the third millennium BC and credited him with the inventions of writing, the calendar, medicine and the ancestral line of the Huaxia people. He appears in texts from the Warring States and Han periods rather than in contemporaneous records, and modern archaeology does not identify a historical empire under his name. His importance is symbolic: imperial and modern Chinese states have used him as a common ancestor of the Chinese nation, especially from the late Qing reform era onward.

Yu the Great is the legendary controller of the floods and the conventional founder of the Xia dynasty, dated in later histories to about 2070 BC and treated as the first hereditary dynasty of China. The story, transmitted in the Book of Documents and Sima Qian's Records of the Grand Historian, presents Yu as inaugurating dynastic rule after the abdication sequence of Yao and Shun. Whether Xia corresponds to an archaeological culture (sometimes associated with Erlitou) remains debated. Yu's founding role is therefore that of the first orthodox dynasty in the received political canon, not that of a documented historical monarch.

Qin Shi Huang (Ying Zheng, 259–210 BC), King of Qin and, from 221 BC, first Emperor of China, created the first unified Chinese empire by conquering the other Warring States. He invented the title huangdi ("emperor"), abolished the old Zhou fiefs in favour of commanderies and counties staffed by appointed officials, and standardized script, currency, weights, measures and axle widths. Roads, canals and the linking of northern walls into a single defensive line served the same centralizing purpose. The regime was Legalist, harsh and short-lived: book burning, the burial of scholars (as later tradition has it) and forced labour provoked revolt after his death, and Qin collapsed in 207–206 BC. Institutionally, however, the imperial title, the bureaucratic territorial state and the idea of a single "All-under-Heaven" are his founding bequests; every later dynasty claimed to inherit them.

Liu Bang (Emperor Gaozu of Han, 256–195 BC) founded the Han dynasty in 202 BC after the civil war that followed Qin's fall. He kept Qin's commandery system and legal-administrative machinery but relaxed its most punitive features, restored limited princely kingdoms, and stabilized a ruling house that lasted, with one interruption, until AD 220. Under his successors, especially Emperor Wu of Han, Confucian canon and the imperial academy became the official ideology of the state. The Han gave its name to the majority ethnic identity (Hanren) and fixed the template of Chinese empire – emperor, bureaucracy, examinations in later form, and cultural unity – that Qin had sketched but not made durable. For that reason many historians treat Gaozu, rather than Qin Shi Huang alone, as the founder of imperial China as a lasting political form.

Emperor Wen of Sui (Yang Jian, 541–604) founded the Sui dynasty in 581 and in 589 conquered the southern Chen, ending nearly four centuries of division between north and south. He replaced hereditary local power with a bureaucracy selected by recommendation and early examinations, enforced the rule that officials could not serve in their native places, simplified regional administration, and gave durable form to the Three Departments and Six Ministries. The Kaihuang Code and a new capital at Daxing (later Chang'an) completed the reconstruction of a single imperial centre. Like Qin, Sui was short-lived and fell after the overreach of Emperor Yang of Sui, but the Tang inherited its frontiers, institutions and claim to rule a reunited empire. Wen is therefore the founder of China's second imperial unification, the political order that lasted, through successive houses, until 1912.

The Hongwu Emperor (Zhu Yuanzhang, 1328–1398), a former peasant and monk, rose through the Red Turban rebellions, took Nanjing, drove the Yuan court from Dadu in 1368 and proclaimed the Ming dynasty. He restored a native dynasty after a century of Mongol rule, recentred the rites of Heaven and Earth on a Chinese emperor, and built a hyper-centralized autocracy: the abolition of the secretariat after 1380 left no prime minister between throne and Six Ministries; the Great Ming Code and the Grand Pronouncements tightened penal control; hereditary military households and a million-strong army were meant to freeze society into self-sufficient rural units. Later nationalist historiography hailed 1368 as the recovery of Han rule. Hongwu did not invent the empire, but he refounded it as a late-imperial, ethnically self-conscious Chinese state whose administrative autocracy the Qing largely kept.

Sun Yat-sen (Sun Wen, 1866–1925) organized the revolutionary movement that overthrew the Qing. He founded the Revive China Society (1894) and the Tongmenghui (1905), formulated the Three Principles of the People (nationalism, democracy, people's livelihood), and after the Wuchang Uprising was elected first provisional president of the Republic of China, taking office in Nanjing on 1 January 1912. He resigned in favour of Yuan Shikai to secure the Qing abdication, then rebuilt a party-state in the south as leader of the Kuomintang. In 1940 the Nationalist government conferred on him the title Guofu ("Father of the Nation"), still official in the Taiwan Area of the Republic of China. The People's Republic of China calls him the "forerunner of the revolution" and honours him as a precursor rather than as head of the present state. Sun founded the first Chinese republic and the political vocabulary of modern Chinese nationalism; he did not live to govern a unified country.

Mao Zedong.

Mao Zedong (1893–1976), a founding member of the Chinese Communist Party (1921), emerged from the Jiangxi Soviet, the Long March and the Yan'an period as the party's unchallenged leader. On 1 October 1949 he proclaimed the People's Republic of China in Beijing after the Communist victory in the civil war. Land reform, the 1954 constitution, the nationalization of industry and the party-state built on Leninist lines created the institutions of the PRC, which the state has not officially titled "Father of the Nation" for any individual. Mao is therefore the founder of the present government of mainland China. His later campaigns, notably the Great Leap Forward and the Cultural Revolution, caused mass famine and political destruction; they belong to the record of the regime he founded rather than to a separate founding act. The Republic of China, relocated to Taiwan in 1949, continues to treat Sun, not Mao, as national founder.

Deng Xiaoping (1904–1997) did not found the People's Republic, but he refounded its political economy after Mao's death and is widely described, including in official Chinese usage, as the "chief architect of reform and opening" (gaige kaifang). Purged twice during the Cultural Revolution, he returned to the centre in 1977–78 and, at the Third Plenum of the Eleventh Central Committee in December 1978, shifted the party's priority from class struggle to economic modernization. The household-responsibility system dismantled collective farming in all but name; special economic zones, beginning with Shenzhen, opened the coast to foreign capital; and the formula "socialism with Chinese characteristics" justified market mechanisms inside a Leninist party-state. The 1982 constitution, the restoration of universities and the diplomatic opening symbolized by the 1979 establishment of relations with the United States completed the break with Maoist autarky. Deng never held the posts of party general secretary or head of state in this period; his authority rested on the Central Military Commission and on paramount leadership. The same regime crushed the 1989 Tiananmen Square protests on his instruction, so the founding claim is that of a durable authoritarian market order, not of political liberalization. After his 1992 southern tour relaunched reform, the growth model he designed became the basis of the PRC's later wealth and global weight. In that institutional sense he is a father of contemporary China, as distinct from the revolutionary state proclaimed in 1949.

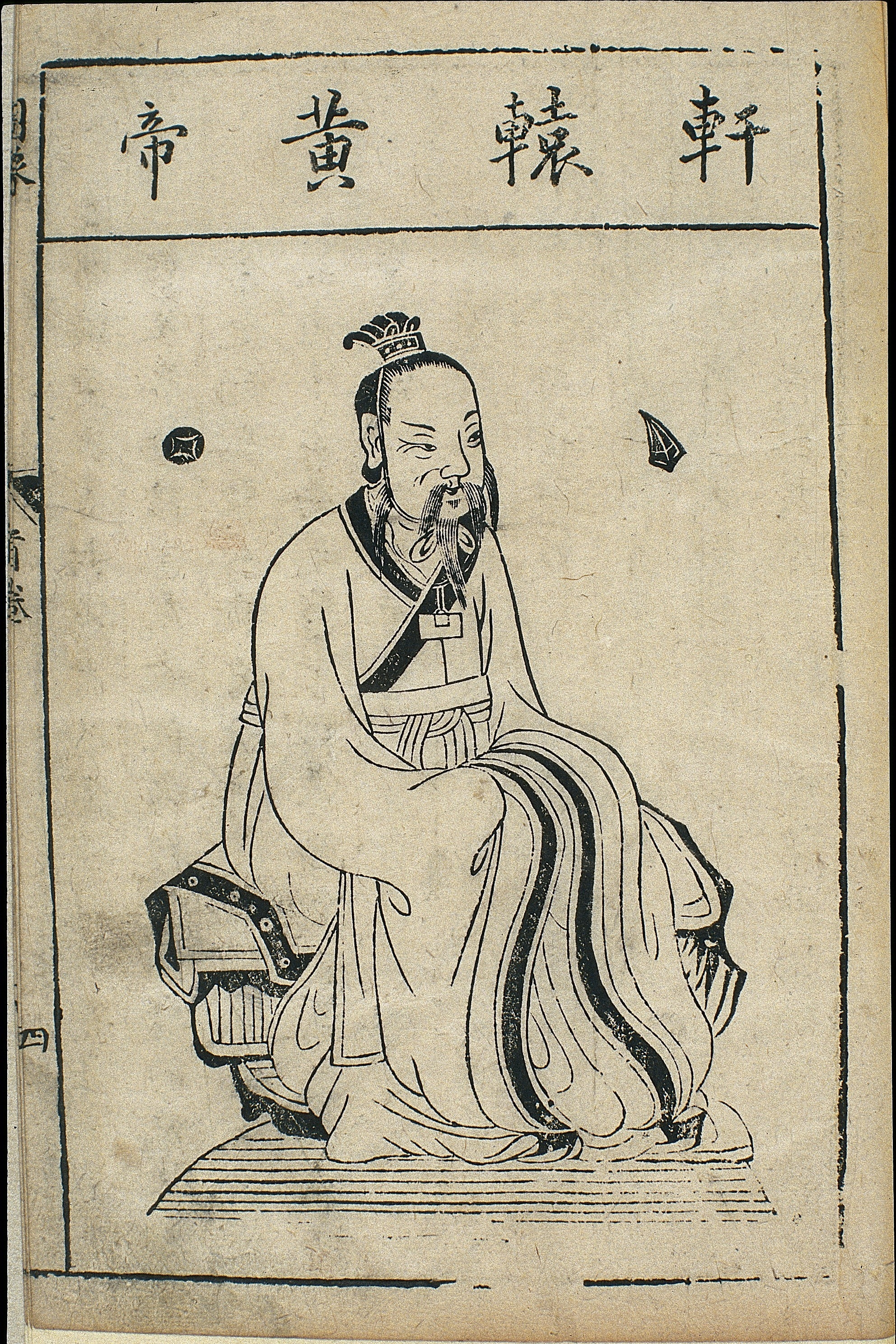
Yellow Emperor

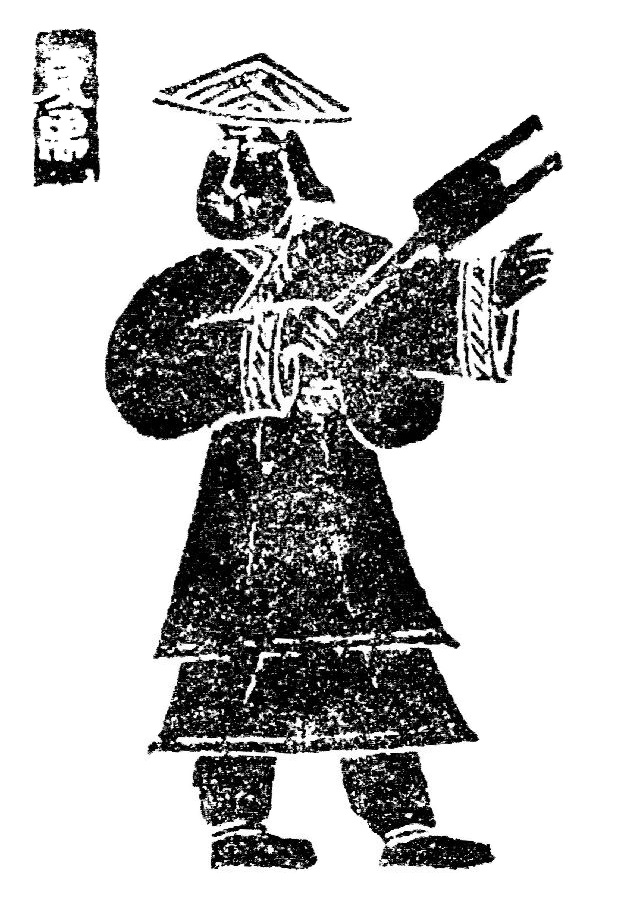
Yu the Great

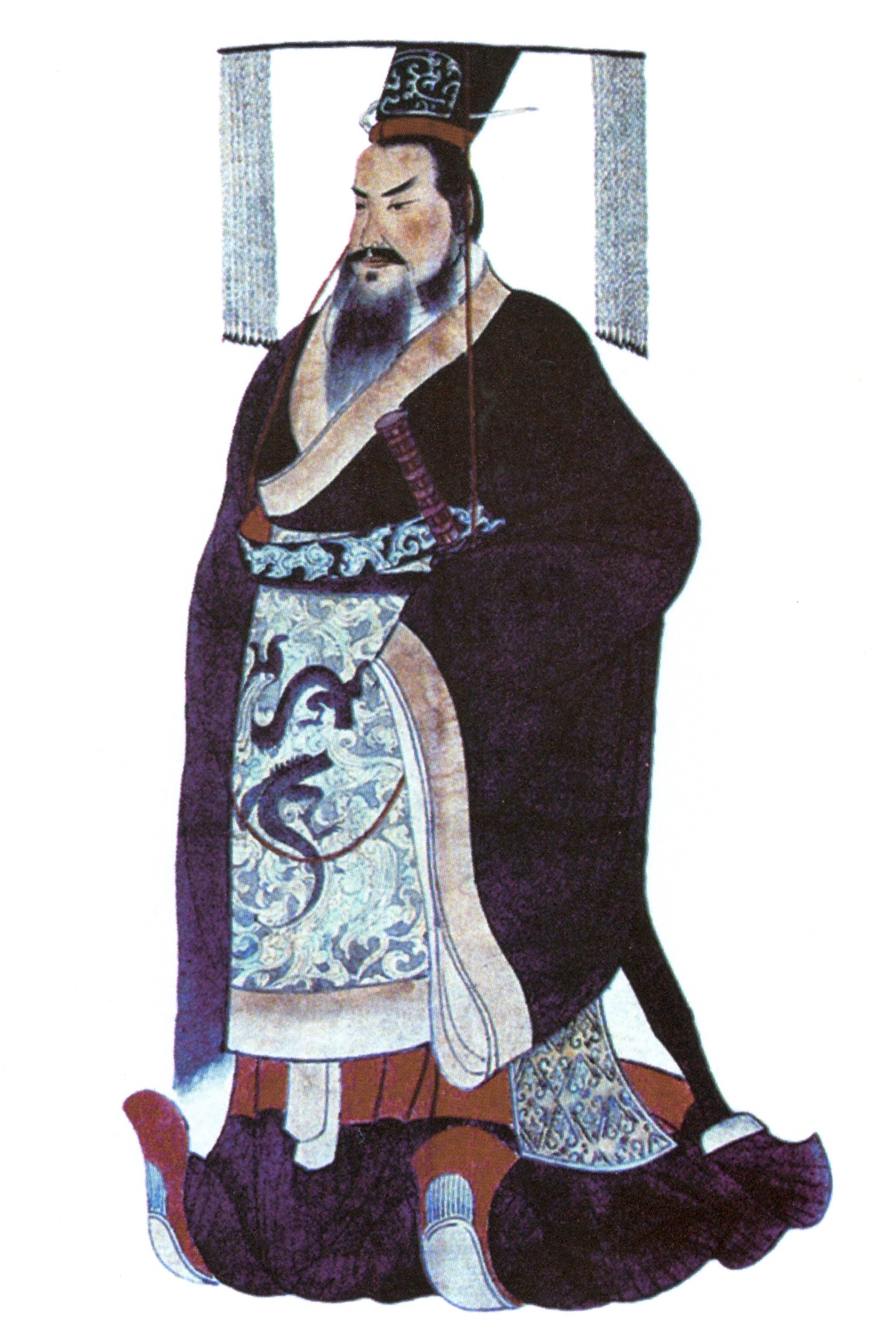
Qin Shi Huang

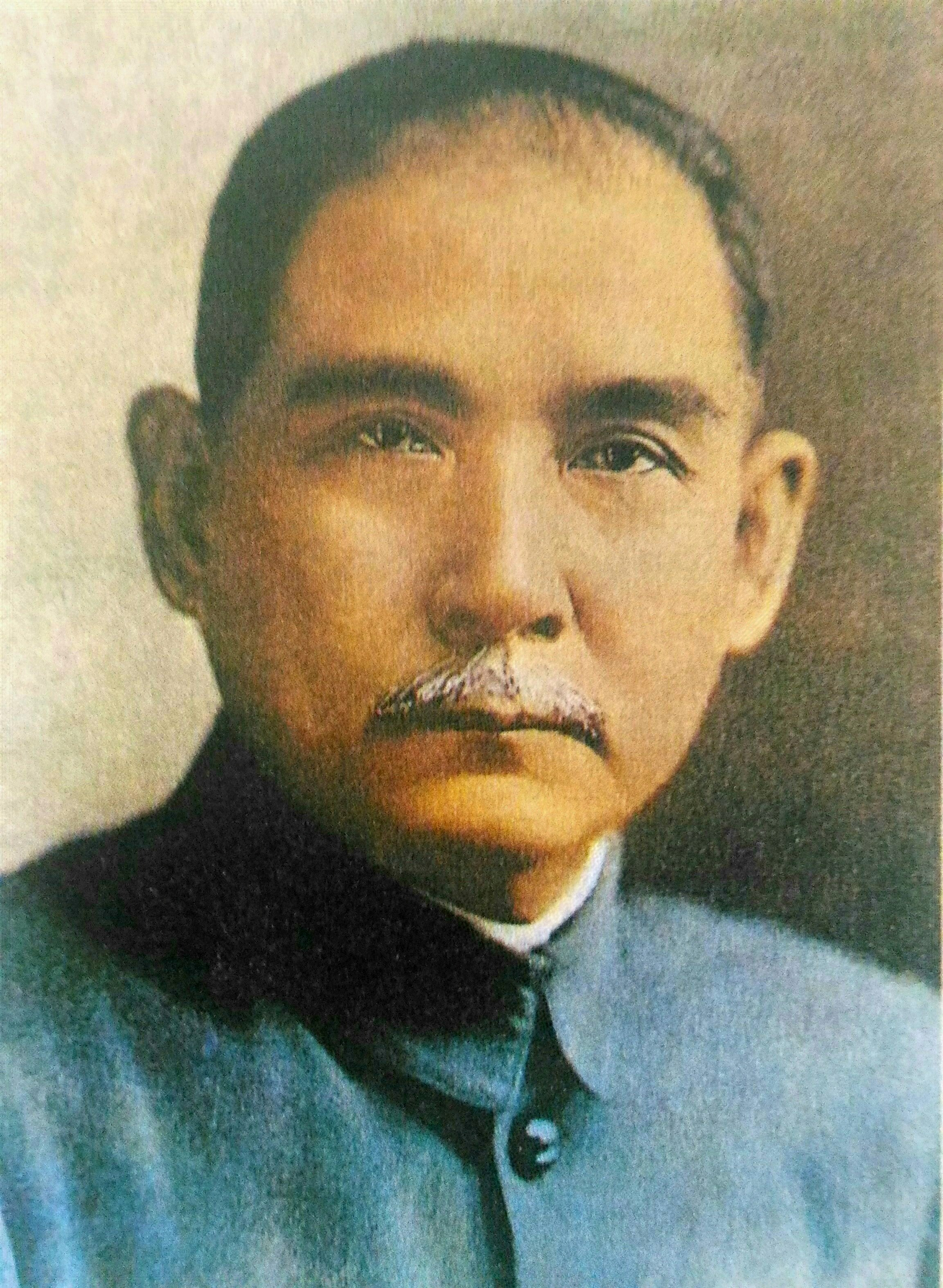
Sun Yat-sen

=== Cyprus ===
Makarios III (1913–1977), archbishop and primate of the autocephalous Eastern Orthodox Church of Cyprus (1950–1977), and first president of Cyprus (1960–1977), is widely regarded by Greek Cypriots as the Father of the Nation or "Ethnarch".

Conversely, Rauf Denktaş (1924–2012), under Makarios III second and last Vice President of Cyprus (1973–1974), and first President of Northern Cyprus (1983–2005), is considered the founding father of Northern Cyprus.

=== India ===
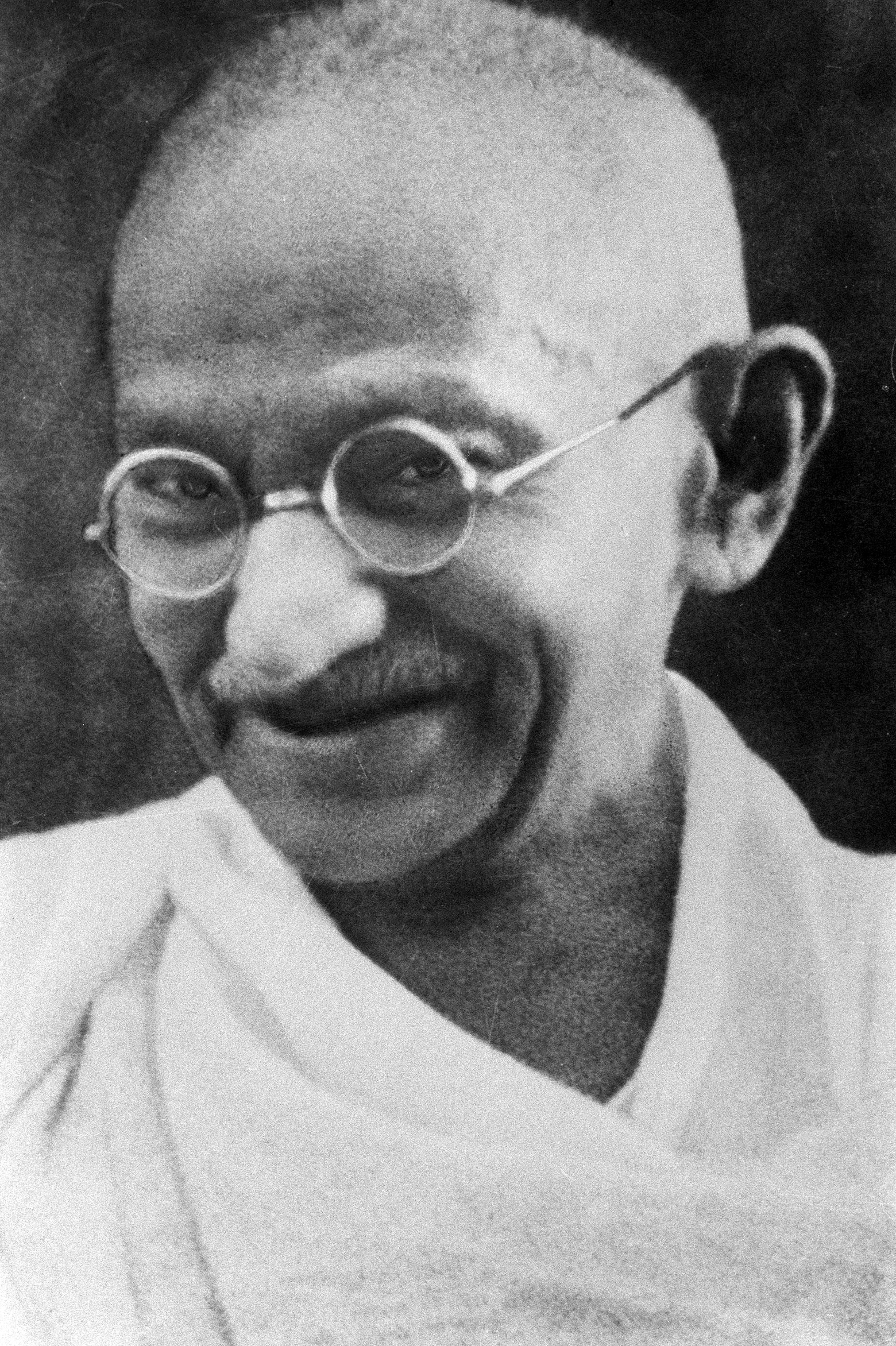
Mahatma Gandhi

Mahatma Gandhi (1869–1948) is considered the father of the nation and most prominent leader of the Indian independence movement.

=== Indonesia ===
There were 68 founding figures (tokoh pendiri) of Indonesia, with the four key drafting groups/figures, being Sukarno, Mohammad Hatta, Soepomo, and Muhammad Yamin. The 4 general founders of Indonesia are generally considered to be Sukarno, Mohammad Hatta, Sutan Sjahrir, and Tan Malaka. Sukarno is considered to be a founding father by some Indonesians, although he had an authoritarian rule during the time of his presidency. Mohammad Hatta is generally considered as one of the more democratic founder of Indonesia. They both signed the Proclamation of Independence, proclaiming the independence of Indonesia from the Netherlands on 17 August 1945. A day later, they were elected respectively as the first President and Vice President of Indonesia.

As the Netherlands did not recognize the proclamation of independence immediately, both of them were prominent figures and were seen as symbol of unity among Indonesian people to fight against Dutch during the National Revolution from 1945 to 1949. In August 1949, Hatta headed a delegation to The Hague for a Round Table Conference which then led to the recognition of Indonesian independence by the Netherlands on 27 December 1949.

Sukarno

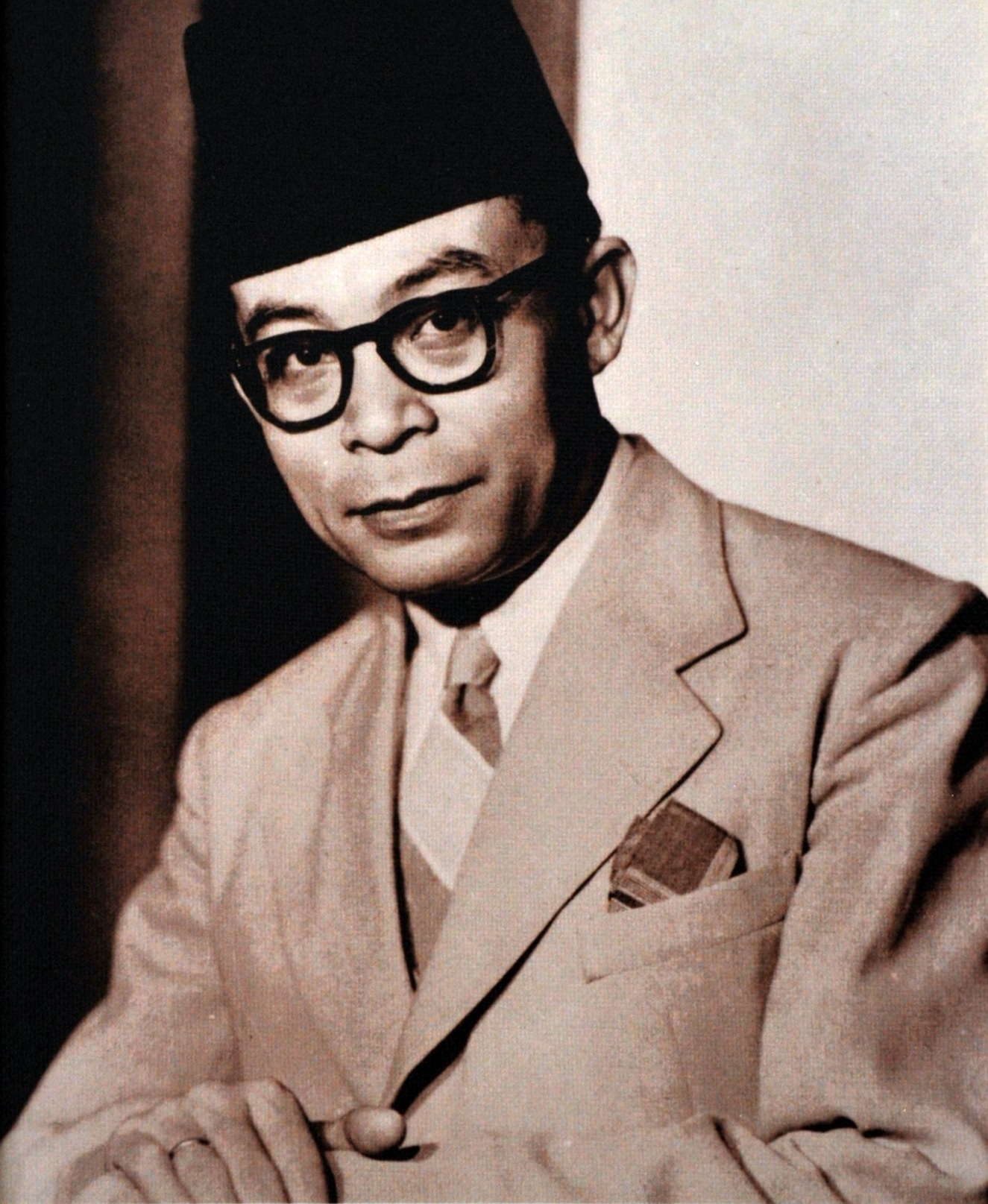
Mohammad Hatta

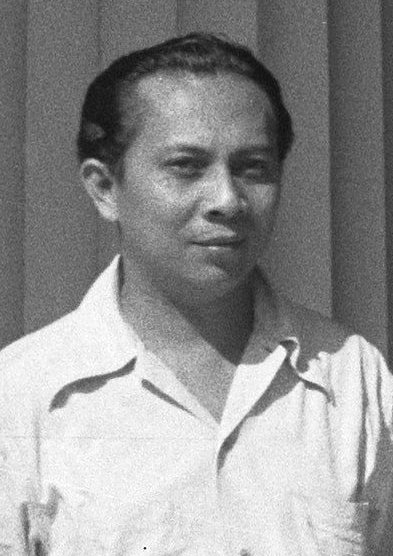
Sutan Sjahrir

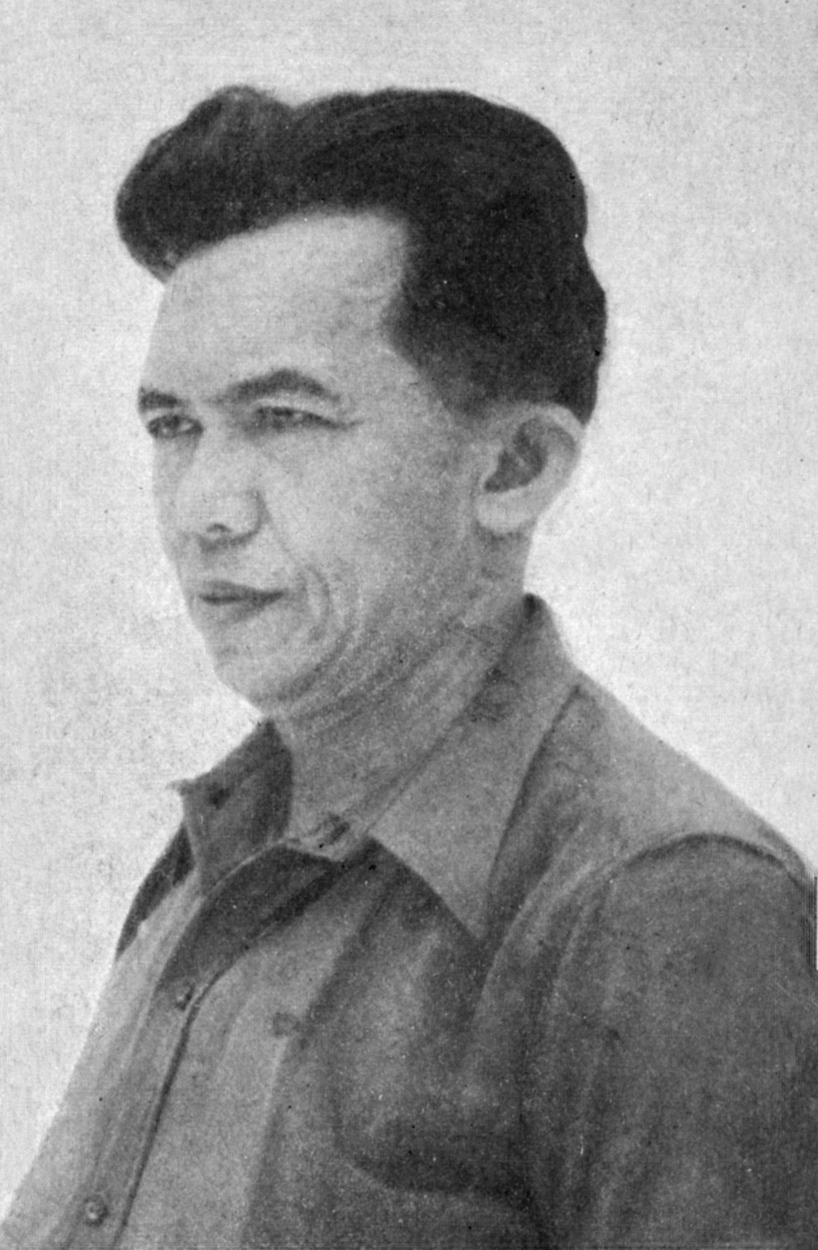
Tan Malaka

=== Iran ===
Cyrus the Great (600–530 BC) was the founder of the First Persian Empire under the Achaemenid dynasty. Many Iranians gather at his tomb in Pasargadae annually on the Cyrus the Great Day and Nowruz, the Persian New Year. Prior to the 1979 Revolution the 2,500th year of Foundation of Imperial State of Iran took place. It consisted of an elaborate set of festivities that took place on 12–16 October 1971 on the occasion of the 2,500th anniversary of the founding of the Imperial State of Iran and First Persian Empire by Cyrus the Great. The intent of the celebration was to demonstrate Iran's old civilization and history to showcase its contemporary advancements under Mohammad Reza Pahlavi, the last Shah of Iran.

Ruhollah Khomeini is considered the founder of the modern Islamic Republic of Iran.

=== Israel ===
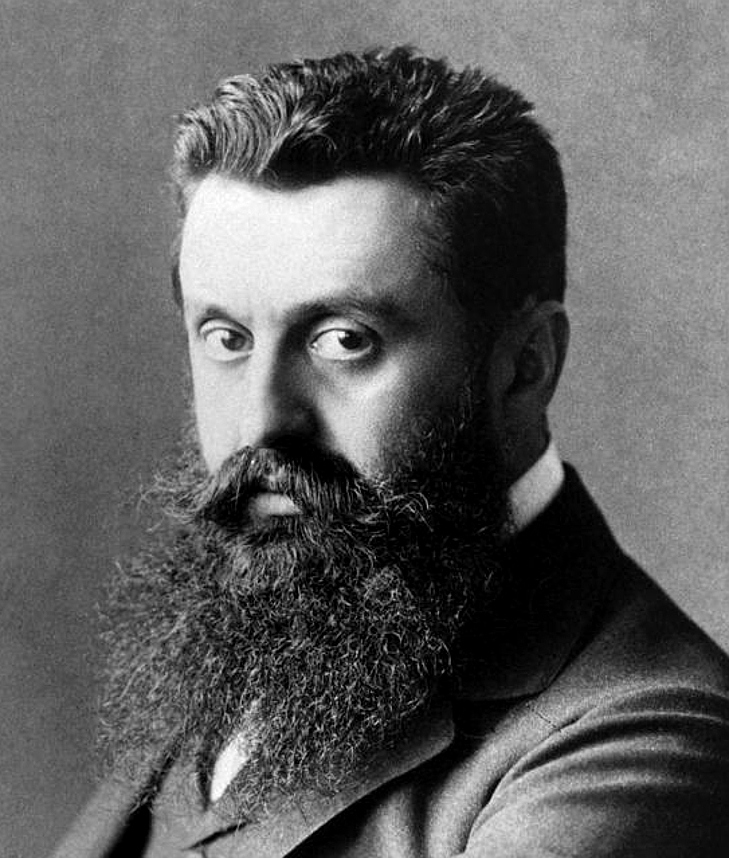
Theodor Herzl of Israel.

Theodor Herzl is considered the founder of political Zionism, the modern ideology that institutionalized the longstanding Jewish desire to return to the homeland, which eventually lead to the founding of Israel decades later.

David Ben-Gurion was the first Prime Minister of Israel, and is often considered an important founding figure as well as a leader of Labor Zionism, Israel's founding ideology. Ben-Gurion lead Israel for a total of thirteen years and is today admired by both the left and the right.

Other figures include Moshe Dayan, who became a war hero and symbol of the Israel Defense Forces and Eliezer Ben-Yehuda who led the revival of the Hebrew language.

=== Japan ===
Emperor Jimmu (神武天皇, Jinmu-tennō) (traditional reign 660–585 BC) was the first emperor of Japan, according to the traditional order of succession. The Japanese national holiday National Foundation Day (建国記念の日, Kenkoku Kinen no Hi) is celebrated annually on 11 February in commemoration of the founding of the nation of Japan and the ascension of Emperor Jimmu to the imperial throne.

=== Jordan ===
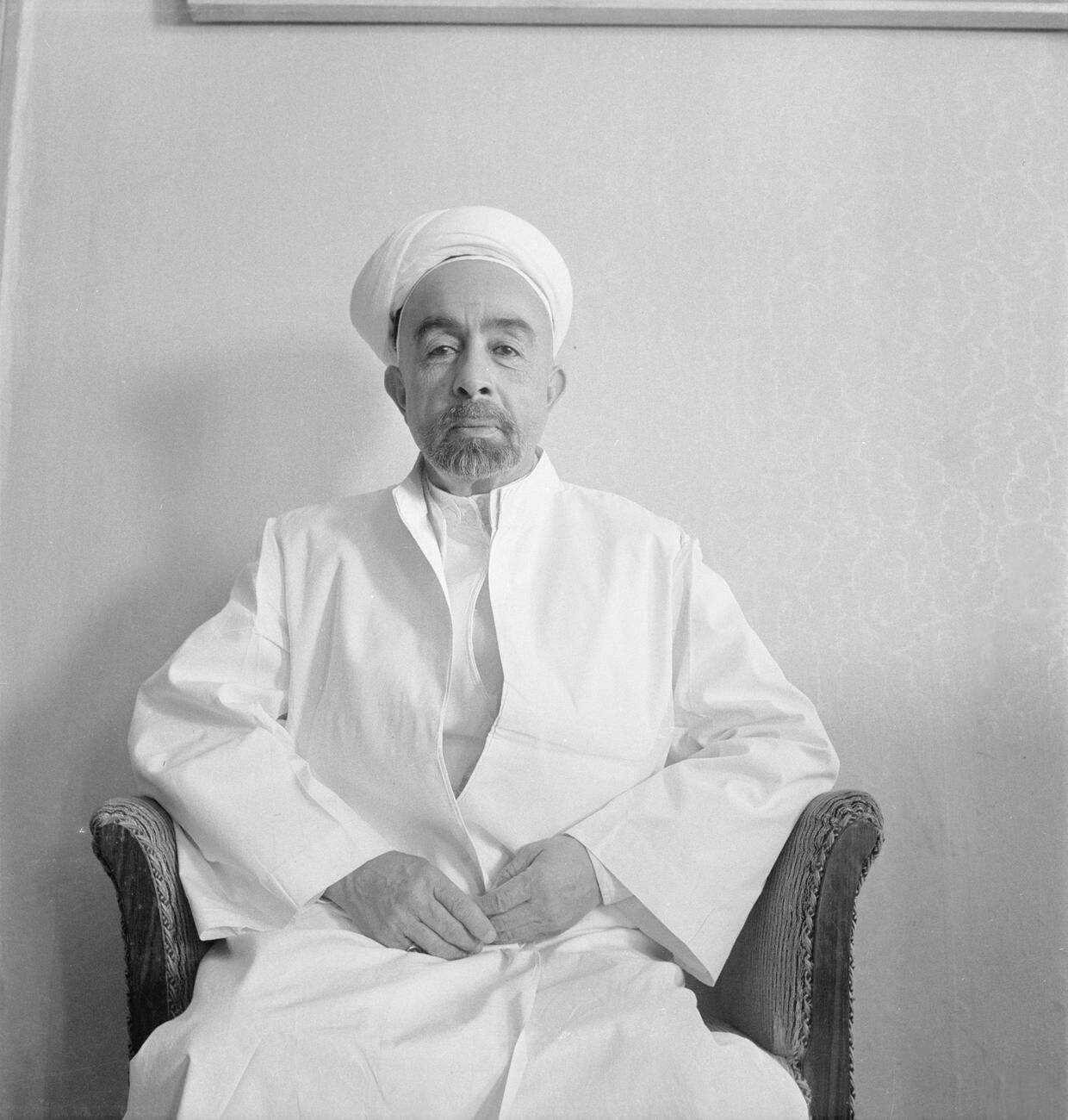
Abdullah I of Jordan

Abdullah bin Al-Hussain was the founder and ruler of the Jordanian realm from 11 April 1921 until his assassination on 20 July 1951.

He was the Emir of Transjordan, a British protectorate, until 25 May 1946, after which he was the king of an independent Jordan. He was a 38th-generation direct descendant of Muhammad, as he belongs to the Hashemite family.

=== Kazakhstan ===
No individual is officially recognized by law in Kazakhstan as the "Father of the Nation" or "National Founder", although these titles may be used informally or symbolically to refer to prominent historical figures associated with the development of Kazakh statehood, national identity, or the current Republic of Kazakhstan.

- Kerei Khan (c. 1424–1473/74) and Janibek Khan (c. 1428–c. 1480) were the founders and first rulers of the Kazakh Khanate, traditionally dated to around 1465–1466. Descendants of the Jochi dynasty, they led a migration of tribes into Jetisu and established a new political entity that became the foundation of subsequent Kazakh statehood. They are consequently regarded as the founders of the Kazakh Khanate and among the principal historical founders of Kazakh statehood.
- Alikhan Bukeikhanov (1866–1937) was a Kazakh statesman, politician, publicist, teacher, writer and scholar, a deputy of the State Duma and a leading figure of the Kazakh intelligentsia and the principal leader of the Alash movement. He advocated Kazakh political autonomy, national education, modernization and the development of national institutions. As leader of the Alash movement and head of the Alash Autonomy government, he became one of the principal figures in the development of modern Kazakh national political thought. Along with other members of the Kazakh intelligentsia, his political and intellectual work contributed to the development of modern Kazakh national consciousness and later became an important part of the country's national revival and independence movement. Following the establishment of Soviet rule, he withdrew from active political life and worked in scientific and literary fields. He was arrested several times by the Soviet authorities and executed in Moscow in 1937 during the Great Purge.
- Nursultan Nazarbayev (born 1940) became the first president of Republic of Kazakhstan following the dissolution of the Soviet Union in December 1991 and remained in office until his resignation in 2019. He played a central role in establishing the institutions of the newly independent republic and shaping its early domestic, economic and foreign policies. In 2010, the Parliament of Kazakhstan granted him the constitutional title Elbasy (Kazakh: Елбасы, lit. 'Leader of the Nation') in recognition of his role in the formation and development of independent Kazakhstan. During the 2022 constitutional reforms, a draft proposal to constitutionally recognize Nazarbayev as the "Founder of independent Kazakhstan" was withdrawn following public controversy and removed from the final draft of the amendments submitted to the 2022 referendum. The reforms also removed his constitutional status as Elbasy, while the separate Law "On the First President of the Republic of Kazakhstan – Elbasy" was subsequently annulled by the Constitutional Court in January 2023.
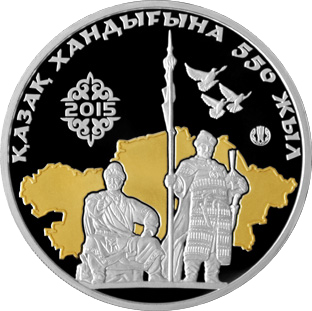
  2015 commemorative 500-tenge coin marking the 550th anniversary of the Kazakh Khanate, depicting founders Kerei Khan and Janibek Khan.
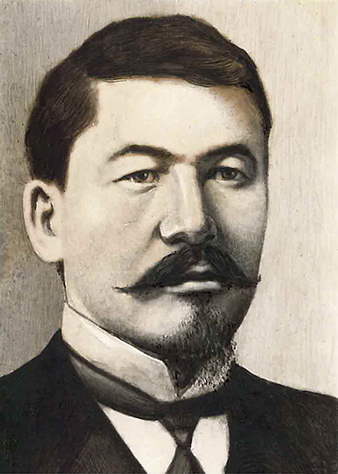
  Alikhan Bukeikhanov
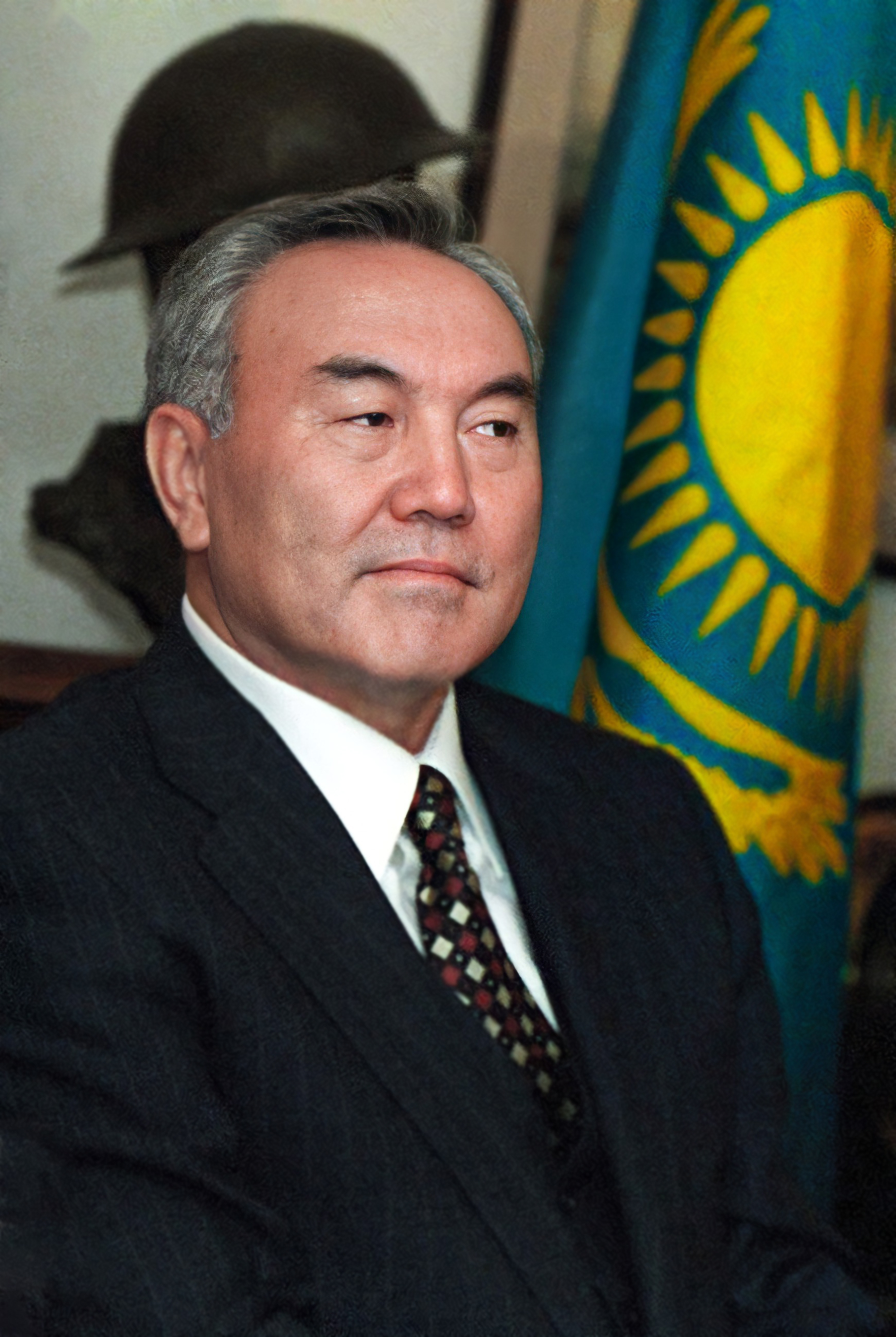
  Nursultan Nazarbayev

=== North Korea ===
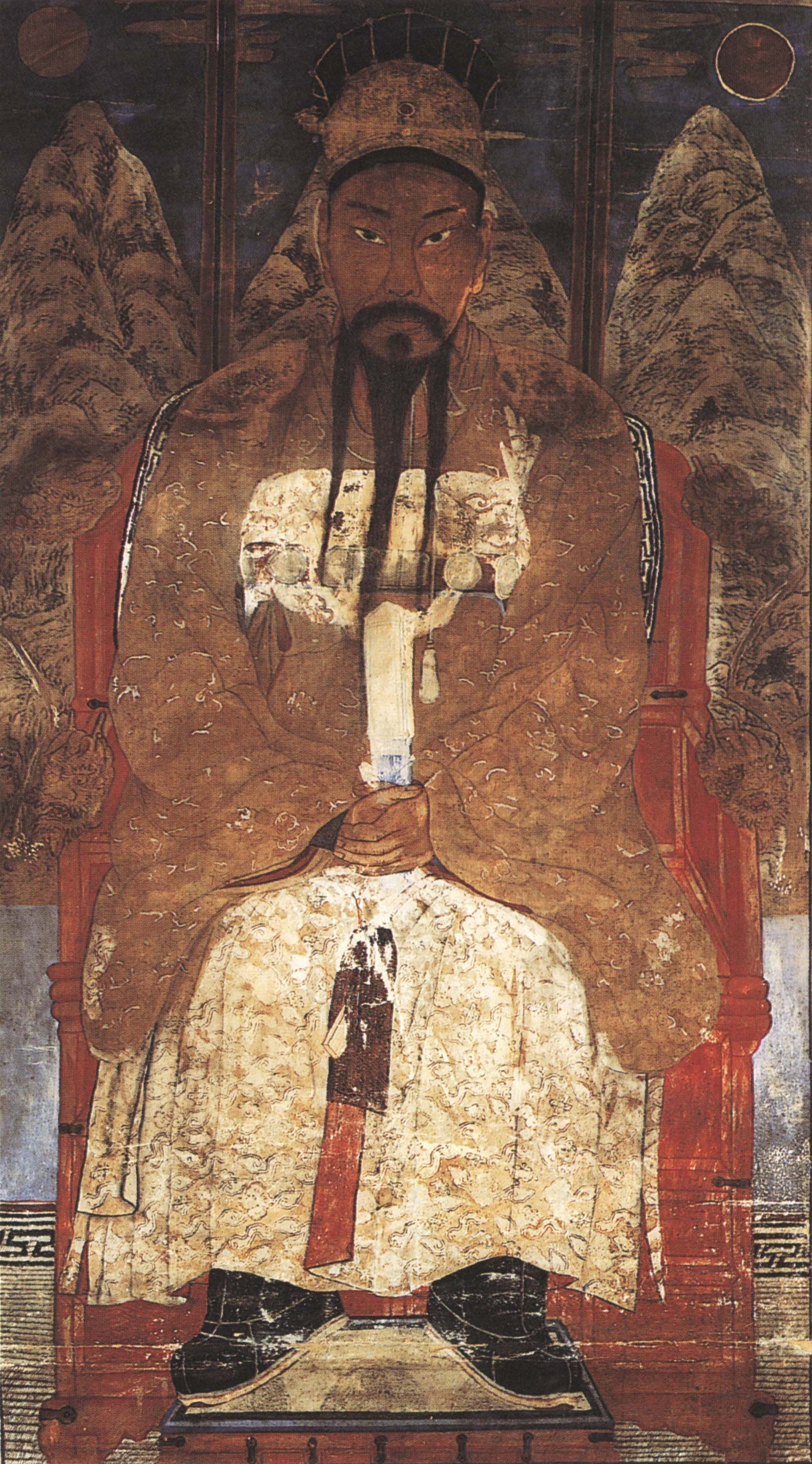
Dangun, Legendary founding father of Korea.

Kim Il-sung was the founder of North Korea. He ruled from 1948 to 1994. After his death, he was declared as the Eternal President of North Korea in 1998.

=== South Korea ===
Dangun, the legendary first king of Gojoseon, is venerated in Korea as the founder of the Korean nation and its people. His legendary birthday and the day he founded Gojoseon is celebrated as National Foundation Day (개천절), which falls on 3 October. There have been many founders throughout Korean history, such as Lee Seonggye, Taejo Wang Geon, and Dongmyeong the Great.

There is no official founding father of South Korea who is generally accepted or acknowledged by the government, though some figures like Syngman Rhee or Kim Ku are proposed as the father of the country.

=== Kuwait ===
The first recorded ruler of Kuwait was Sheikh Abu Salman Sabah. However, Sheikh Mubarak Al-Kabir is known as the founder of the modern state of Kuwait. He was instrumental in moving the country away from the Ottoman Empire and toward British influence.

=== Laos ===
Fa Ngum is widely considered a founding father of the Lao people. In present-day Laos, Kaysonne Phomvihane and Prince Souphanouvoung are considered the fathers of the Marxist–Leninist state.

=== Malaysia ===
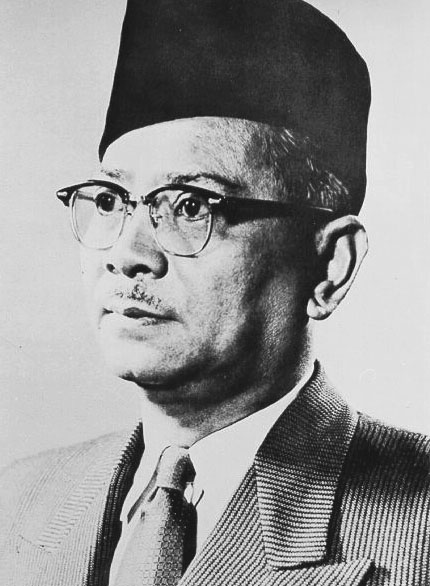
Tunku Abdul Rahman of Malaysia

Tunku Abdul Rahman (1903–1990) usually known as "the Tunku" (a princely title in Malaysia), and also called Bapa Kemerdekaan (Father of Independence) or Bapa Malaysia (Father of Malaysia), was Chief Minister of the Federation of Malaya from 1955, and the country's first Prime Minister from independence in 1957. He remained Prime Minister after Sabah, Sarawak, and Singapore joined in 1963 to form Malaysia.

=== Mongolia ===
Genghis Khan posthumous portrait

Genghis Khan (c. 1162–1227), who by uniting the nomadic tribes founded the Mongol Empire, is generally regarded as the father of modern-day Mongolia. Although downcast during the communist-era, Genghis Khan's reputation surged after the democratic revolution in 1990.

=== Myanmar ===
Anawrahta is considered to be founder of ancient Burmese Kingdom of Pagan.

General Aung San is the founder of modern Burma (also known as Myanmar). Although he did not live to see the country's independence, he is credited in forming the basic structure of the independence movement and government. Aung San started his political career in 1930 as the editor of Rangoon University's newspaper – where he accused one of the colonial administrators in Burma of misconduct. In late 1940 he went to Japanese controlled Taiwan and Xiamen to receive military training, and he led the Burma Independence Army, spearheading the Japanese invasion of Burma. Later, he switched sides to the Allies, and helped in the Burma campaign. After the war, he was appointed to the government of a returning British administration, and was able to negotiate Burma's independence. He helped organized the Panglong Agreement in February 1947, achieving independence for all Burmese territories. However, on Saturday, 19 July 1947, Aung San, along with his cabinet ministers, was assassinated at the secretariat building in Rangoon.

U Nu served as first Prime Minister of Myanmar from 1948 to 1956.

General Ne Win was one of the founders of Tatmadaw. On 1962, 15 years after the independence, he led a military coup that brought him to power. Ne Win established the Burmese Way to Socialism which ruled Burma for 26 years.

=== Nepal ===
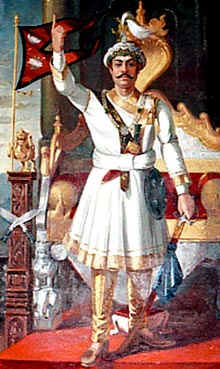
Prithvi Narayan Shah of Nepal

Prithvi Narayan Shah was largely responsible for the unification of Nepal, and is considered to be the founder of Nepal. His vision of ruling over a unified Nepal is said to have started when atop a hill near Nepa Valley (Present day Kathmandu), he decided he would like to rule over it. His strategic plan was very successful and his successors continued to build on his progress. Prithvi Narayan Shah's descendants continued to rule over Nepal for a total of 240 years before the 2006 democracy movement in Nepal toppled the constitutional power exercised by King Gyanendra, before abolishing the monarchy in 2008.

=== Oman ===
Sultan Qaboos bin Said changed the name of the country from the Sultanate of Muscat and Oman to simply Oman.

=== Pakistan ===
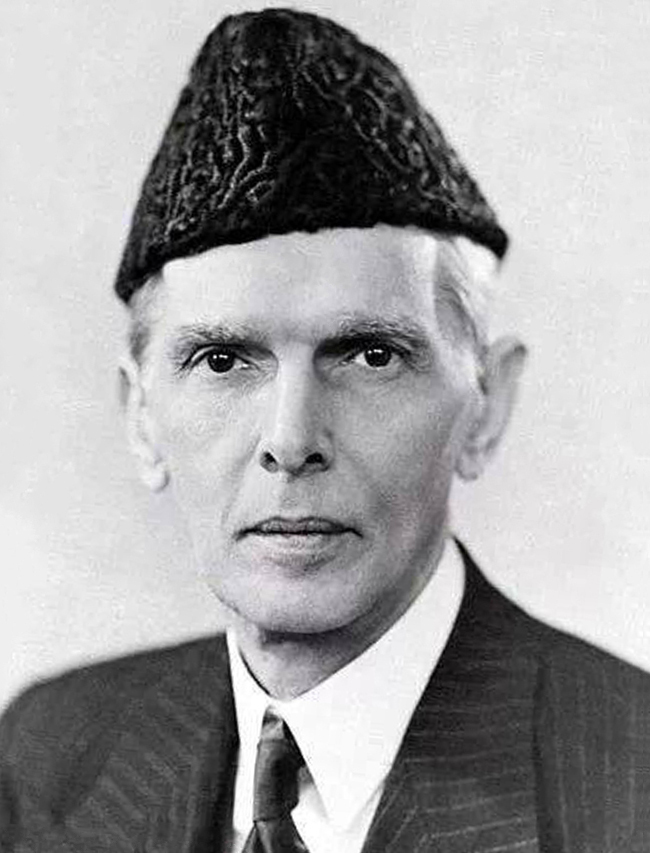
Muhammad Ali Jinnah of Pakistan

Pakistan's founder is Muhammad Ali Jinnah, who is hailed as Quaid-e-Azam or "Great Leader" and Baba-e-Qaum or Father of Nation. He founded not only the Islamic Republic of Pakistan but is credited for creating an entirely new nation state. Other prominent founders include the poet Muhammad Iqbal as a spiritual father, believed to be the first person to propagate the idea of a state for India's Muslims, Fatima Jinnah (Mother of nation) and members of Pakistan's first Cabinet such as Liaquat Ali Khan, A. K. Fazlul Huq, Abdul Rab Nishtar, Malik Feroze Khan Noon, Khwaja Nazimuddin and I. I. Chundrigar.

Some historians credit the Muslim reformist Sir Syed Ahmad Khan as a founder of Pakistan because he provided the Two-Nation Theory which played a central role in the perception of Pakistan and its Muslim nationalist ideology largely based on Iqbal's philosophy and views.

=== Palestine ===
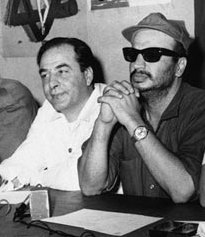
Yasser Arafat of Palestine

Palestinian political leader Yasser Arafat has been considered by some commentators as being the "founding father" of Palestine. Born in 1929 in Cairo, Egypt, Arafat soon became a supporter of Arab nationalism and anti-Zionism; in the 1948 Arab–Israeli War, he fought alongside the Muslim Brotherhood against the newly independent State of Israel. From 1969 until 2004, he served as the chairman of the Palestine Liberation Organization (PLO), a Palestinian nationalist organization which engaged in a numerous guerrilla conflicts with the Israel Defense Forces during the second half of the 20th century.

Beginning from 1983 onwards, Arafat based himself in Tunisia and switched to a tactic of negotiating with the Israeli government, acknowledging Israel's right to exist in a UN resolution and supporting a two-state solution to the Israeli–Palestinian conflict. Arafat engaged in a series of negotiations with the Israeli government to end the conflict between it and the PLO, including the Madrid Conference of 1991, the 1993 Oslo Accords and the 2000 Camp David Summit. In 1994, he returned to Palestine and promoted self-government for the Palestinian territories, receiving the Nobel Peace Prize the same year. Among Palestinians, Arafat is viewed as a martyr who symbolized the national aspirations of his people.

=== Philippines ===
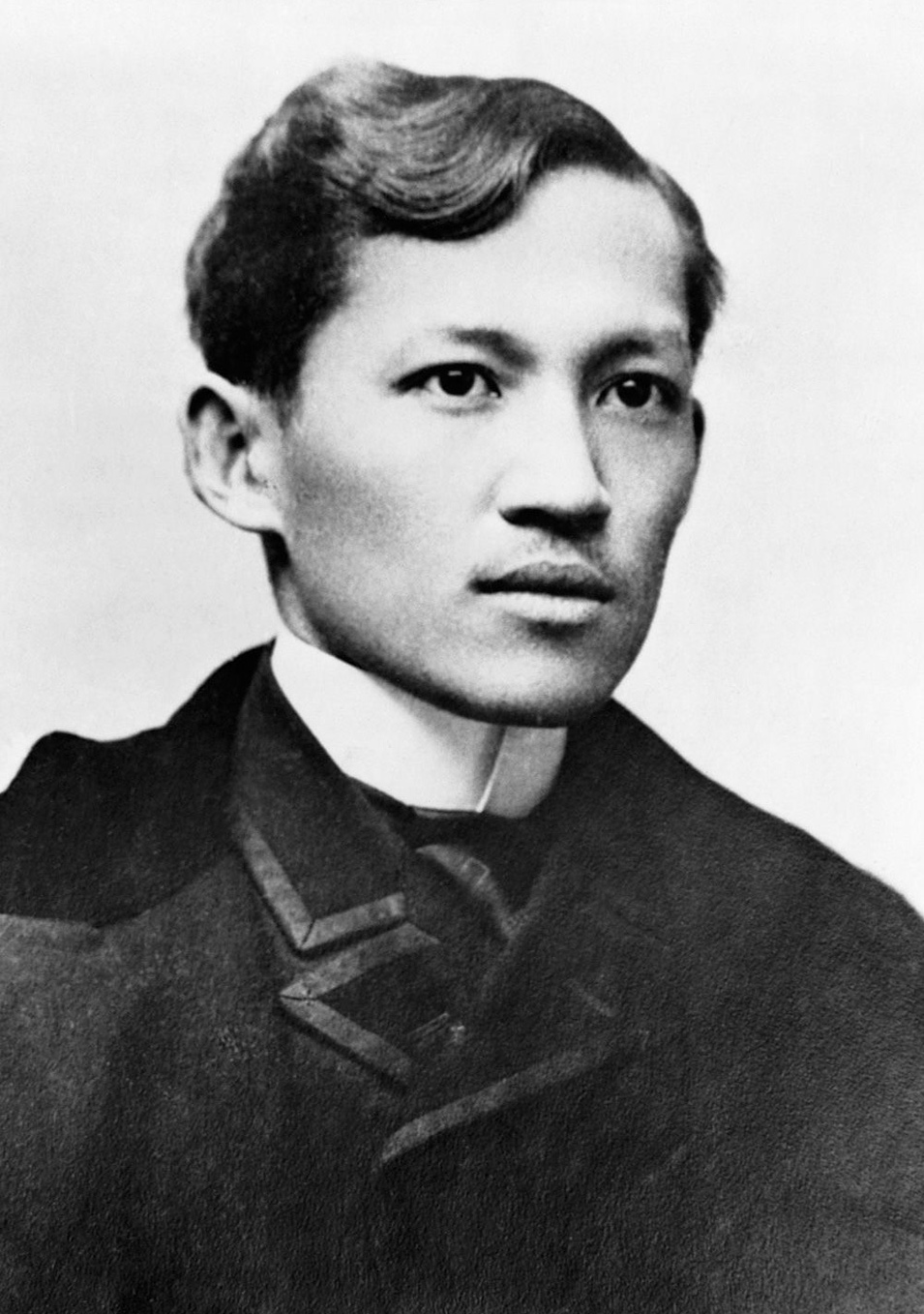
José Rizal of the Philippines

There is no law in the Philippines which officially recognizes any single individual as the "Father of the Nation". Either title may be associated with any of the following prominent historical persons, owing to their impact on the country during their respective times: José Rizal (1861–1896) was a Filipino nationalist during the tail end of the Spanish colonial period of the Philippines. An ophthalmologist by profession, Rizal became a writer and a key member of the Filipino Propaganda Movement which advocated political reforms for the colony under Spain. He was executed by the Spanish colonial government for the crime of rebellion after an anti-colonial revolution, inspired in part by his writings, broke out. Though he was not actively involved in its planning or conduct, he ultimately approved of its goals which eventually led to Philippine independence. He is widely considered one of the greatest heroes of the Philippines, and is implied by Philippine law to be one of the national heroes. He was the author of the novels Noli Me Tángere, and El Filibusterismo, and a number of poems and essays. Andrés Bonifacio (1863–1897) rebel leader during the Philippine Revolution in 1896, which saw armed resistance against the Spanish Empire. Emilio Aguinaldo (1869–1964) Military Leader with the highest rank of Generalissimo of the Philippine Revolution and first president of the Philippines through the 1899 Malolos Congress, which oversaw the promulgation of the Malolos Constitution. Manuel Roxas (1892–1948) served as first President of independent Philippines from 1946 to 1948.

=== Qatar ===
Sheikh Jassim Bin Mohammed Bin Thani is the founder of the State of Qatar. He was a military leader, judge and scholar, knight and poet possessing both gallantry and magnanimity.

=== Saudi Arabia ===
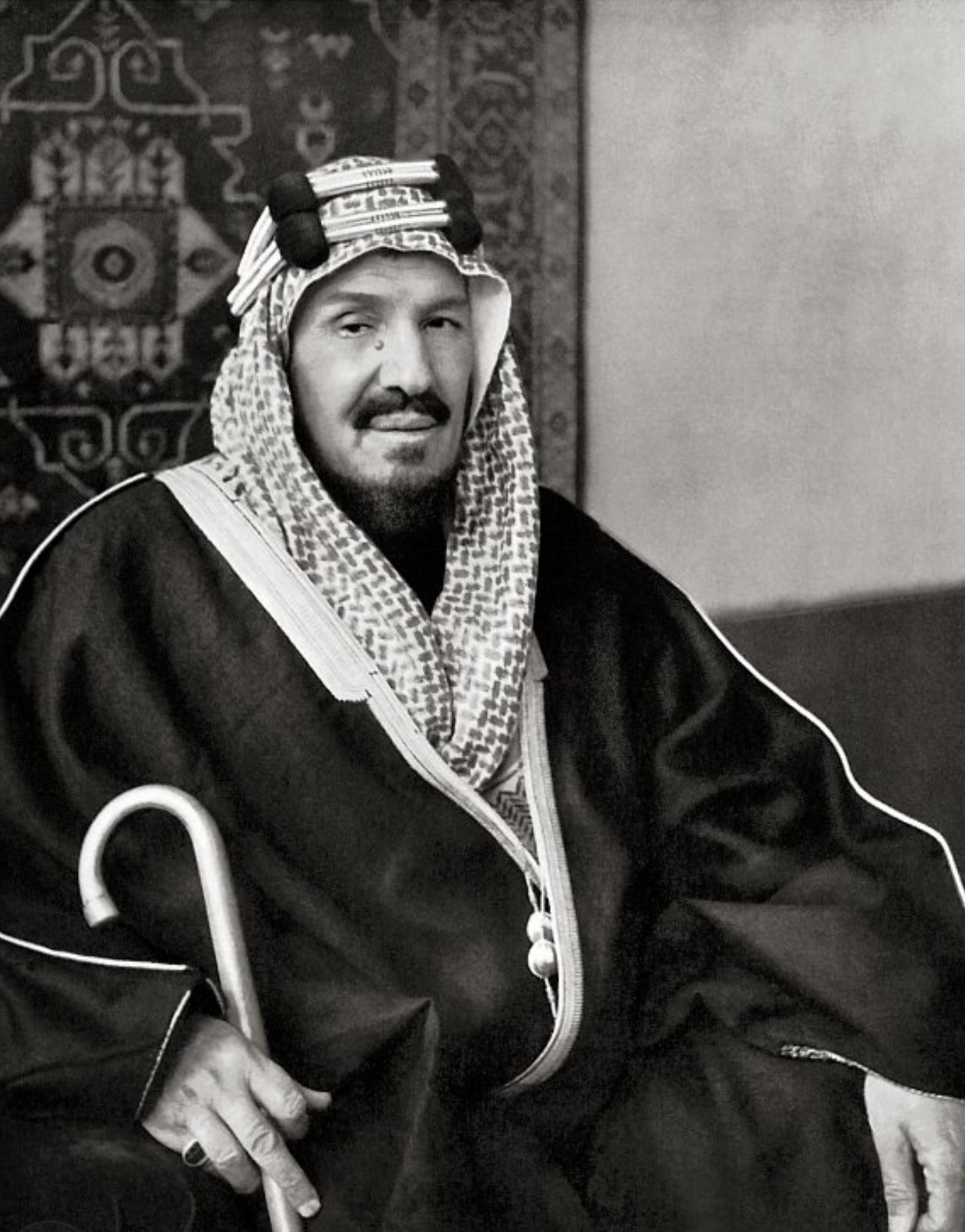
King Abdulaziz of Saudi Arabia

King Abdulaziz, commonly known as Ibn Saud, was the founder and first king of Saudi Arabia. He established the Third Saudi state through a series of military campaigns and political alliances between 1902 and 1934, culminating in the unification of most of the Arabian Peninsula.

=== Singapore ===
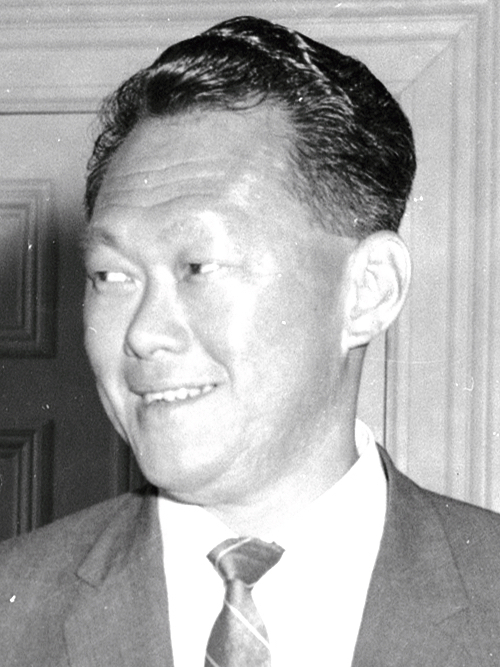
Lee Kuan Yew of Singapore

- Lee Kuan Yew (1923–2015), often referred to by his initials "LKY", was the first prime minister of the Republic of Singapore, governing for three decades, from 1959 to 1990. Lee has helped to build the economy from a third world country to a first world country and turned Singapore into a metropolis after the separation from Malaysia in 1965.
- Goh Keng Swee (1918–2010) was a pivotal figure in Singapore's development, serving as deputy prime minister from 1973 to 1985. Having also served as Minister for Finance, Defence and Education, he was instrumental in transforming Singapore's economic and military capabilities. Goh's tenure included founding the Economic Development Board (EDB) and the Monetary Authority of Singapore (MAS), and he played a key role in the establishment of the Jurong Industrial Estate and the Singapore Armed Forces (SAF).
- Sinnathamby Rajaratnam (1915–2006), known as S. Rajaratnam, was Singapore's first Minister for Foreign Affairs from 1965 to 1980 and the second deputy prime minister from 1980 to 1985. A co-founder of the People's Action Party (PAP), he was a key architect of Singapore's foreign policy, being one of the five founding fathers of ASEAN and a principal author of the National Pledge.

=== Sri Lanka ===
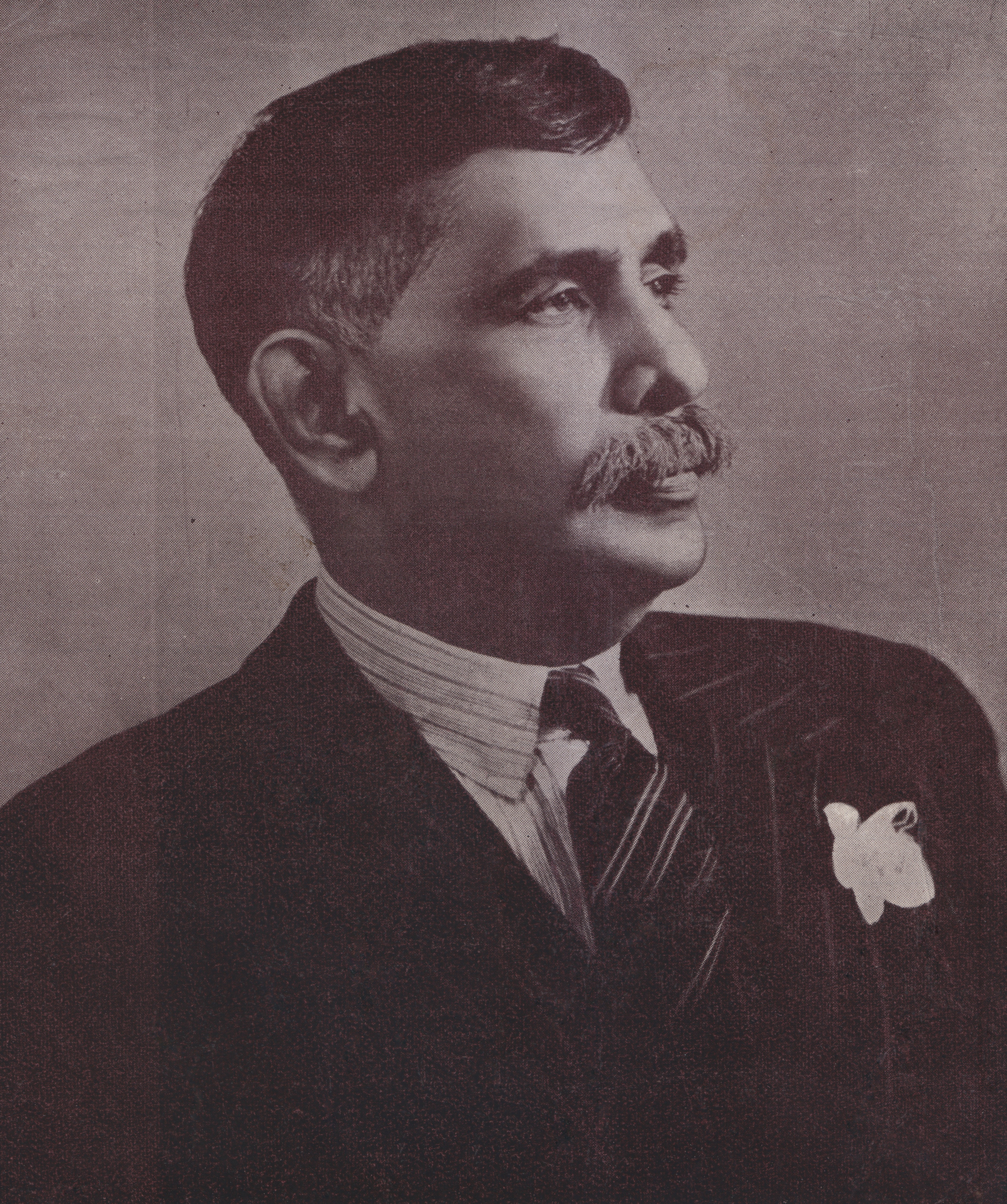
Don Stephen Senanayaka of Sri Lanka

Prince Vijaya is considered to be the first King of Sri Lanka with Dutugemunu honored as the first king to unify Sri Lanka. D. S. Senanayake (1883–1952) is widely known as the modern (post independence) father of the nation. William Gopallawa (1896–1981) was the first Constitutional President while J. R. Jayewardene (1906–1996) was the first Executive President.

=== Thailand ===
- Si Inthrathit (1238–1270) was the founder of Sukhothai Kingdom, the first Thai kingdom.
- Naresuan (1590–1605), who retook most of Siam from the Burmese.
- Taksin the Great (1734–1782), who reunited Siam following the collapse of the Ayutthaya Kingdom.
- Rama I (1737–1809), founder of the Rattanakosin Kingdom and the first monarch of the reigning Chakri dynasty of Siam.

=== Turkey ===
Atatürk, the founding father of the Republic of Turkey

- Alp Arslan (1029–1072) was the second Sultan of the Seljuk Empire. He greatly expanded the Seljuk territory and consolidated his power, defeating rivals to the south and northwest, and his victory over the Byzantines at the Battle of Manzikert, in 1071, ushered in the Turkoman settlement of Anatolia.
- Osman I (1258–1324), was the leader of the Kayi tribe and the founder of the Ottoman dynasty.
- Mehmed the Conqueror (1432–1481), was an Ottoman sultan who ruled from August 1444 to September 1446, and then later from February 1451 to May 1481. When he ascended the throne again in 1451 he strengthened the Ottoman navy and made preparations to attack Constantinople. At the age of 21, he conquered Constantinople (modern-day Istanbul) and brought an end to the Byzantine Empire.
- Mahmud II (1785–1839) was the 30th Sultan of the Ottoman Empire from 1808 until his death in 1839. His reign is recognized for the extensive administrative, military, and fiscal reforms he instituted, which culminated in the Decree of Tanzimat ("reorganization"). Mahmud's reforms included the 1826 abolition of the conservative Janissary corps, which removed a major obstacle to his and his successors' reforms in the Empire. The reforms he instituted were characterized by political and social changes, which would eventually lead to the birth of the modern Turkish Republic.
- Mustafa Kemal Atatürk (1881–1938) was the founder and first president of the Republic of Turkey. Following the First World War, the huge conglomeration of territories and peoples that formerly comprised the Ottoman Empire was divided into several new states. The Turkish War of Independence (1919–1923), initiated by Mustafa Kemal Atatürk and his colleagues in Anatolia, resulted in the establishment of the modern Republic of Turkey (Türkiye Cumhuriyeti) in 1923. He subsequently introduced many radical reforms with the aim of transforming the old multinational Ottoman state into a new secular republic.

=== United Arab Emirates ===
Initially a grouping of seven independent emirates, part of the Trucial states, Zayed bin Sultan Al Nahyan of Abu Dhabi established the United Arab Emirates by joining the seven independent emirates into a federation, together with Rashid bin Saeed Al Maktoum of Dubai. The two agreed on the Union of Emirates with a handshake in a tent in the desert on 18 February 1968. The other five Trucial rulers joined them in that aspiration in a meeting on 25 February 1968, announcing the Federation on 27 February - they were Khalid bin Muhammad Al Qasimi of Sharjah; Rashid bin Humaid Al Nuaimi of Ajman; Ahmad bin Rashid Al Mualla of Umm Al Quwain; Saqr bin Mohammed Al Qasimi of Ras Al Khaimah and Mohammed bin Hamad Al Sharqi of Fujairah. The United Arab Emirates was founded on 2 December 1971.

=== Uzbekistan ===
In Uzbekistan, no single individual is officially recognized as the "Founder of the Nation". However, different figures have been viewed as founders of Uzbekistan during various eras throughout history.

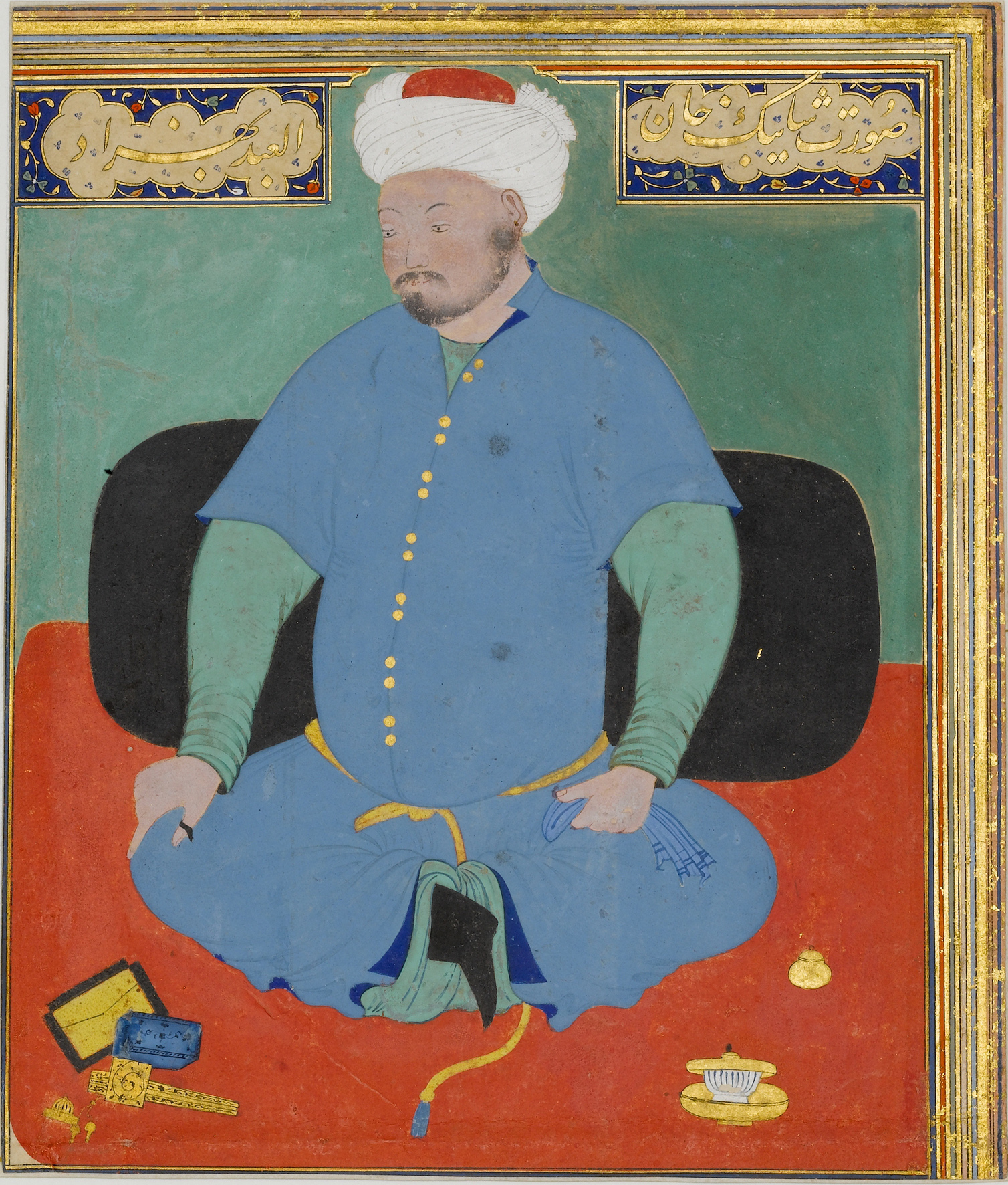
Muhammad Shaybani the Uzbek ruler, founder of Shaybanid dynasty of the Khanate of Bukhara

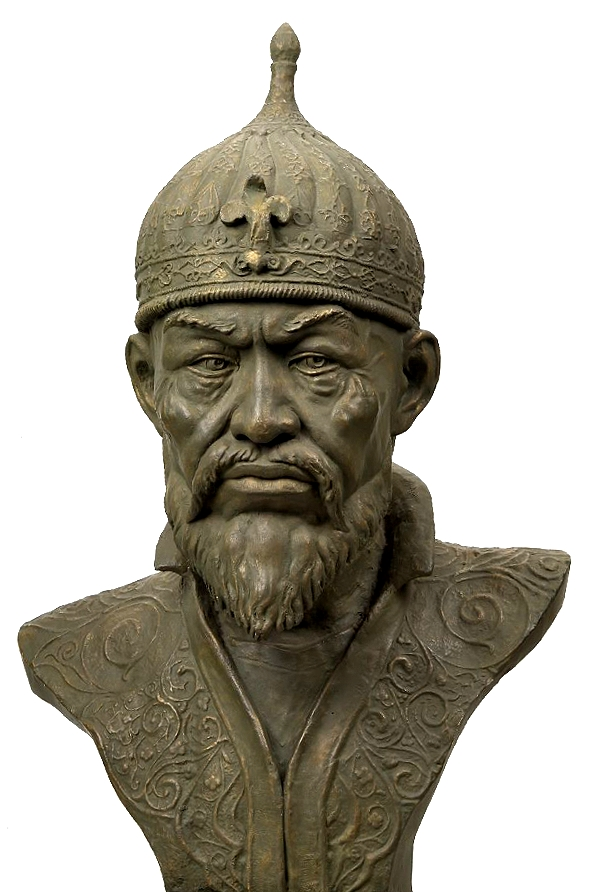
Amir Timur

Amir Timur is widely regarded as the main historical hero for modern Uzbekistan, as he founded the Timurid Empire and made significant contributions to the development of Uzbek statehood.

Another significant historical figure, Muhammad Shaybani, is considered to be a significant founder of the nation due to his proximity in time to the establishment of the Uzbek state. He was an Uzbek leader who consolidated various Uzbek tribes and laid the foundations for their ascendance in Transoxiana and the establishment of the Khanate of Bukhara.

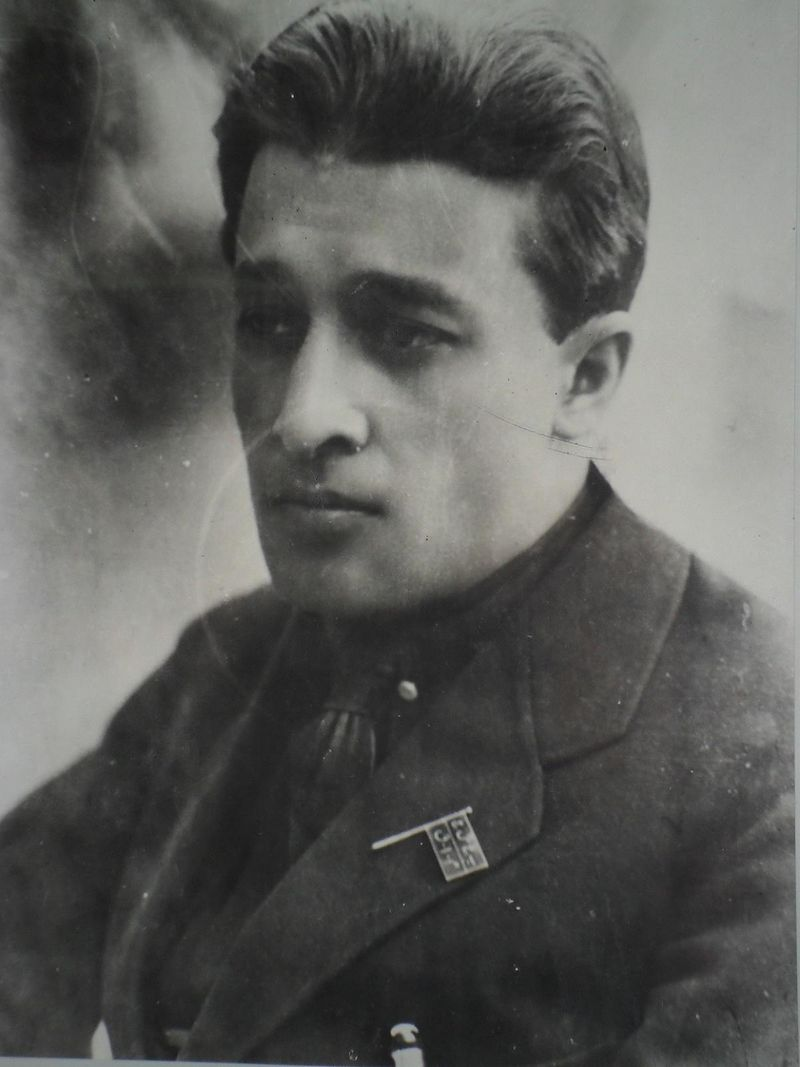
Fayzulla Xoʻjayev in 1896

And Fayzulla Xoʻjayev was the founder of modern Uzbekistan. He first head of the Bukharan People's Soviet Republic, which would later form part of the Uzbek Soviet Socialist Republic. He became well known in the early 20th century as an advocate for Uzbekistani independence and as a leader of the Jadidist movement. This movement aimed to modernize and secularize Islamic society in Central Asia.

Khodzhayev's political career was marked by several challenges, including periods of exile and imprisonment. In 1920, he briefly served as the first prime minister of the Bukharan People's Soviet Republic. As Prime Minister, Khodjaev implemented a series of reforms aimed at promoting industrialization and collectivization in Uzbekistan. He also supported efforts to promote Uzbek culture and language, including the establishment of a national theater and the publication of a national encyclopedia. Khodjaev's political career came to an abrupt end in 1937, when he was arrested as part of Joseph Stalin's Great Purge. He was accused of espionage and treason and was executed in 1938. Today, Khodjaev is remembered as an important figure in the history of Uzbekistan and as a symbol of the complex relationship between the Central Asian republics and the Soviet Union. His legacy continues to be debated, with some seeing him as a progressive reformer and others as a Soviet stooge who contributed to the suppression of Uzbek national identity.

=== Vietnam ===
Kinh Dương Vương – Lạc Long Quân and the Hùng Kings were the founders of the Hồng Bàng dynasty – the first dynasty of Vietnam and laid the foundation to form the country of Vietnam.

Ho Chi Minh is the founder of Socialist Republic of Vietnam.

=== Yemen ===
Yahya Muhammad Hamid ed-Din ruled as first independent King of Mutawakkilite Kingdom of Yemen from 1918 to 1948.

== Europe ==
=== Albania ===
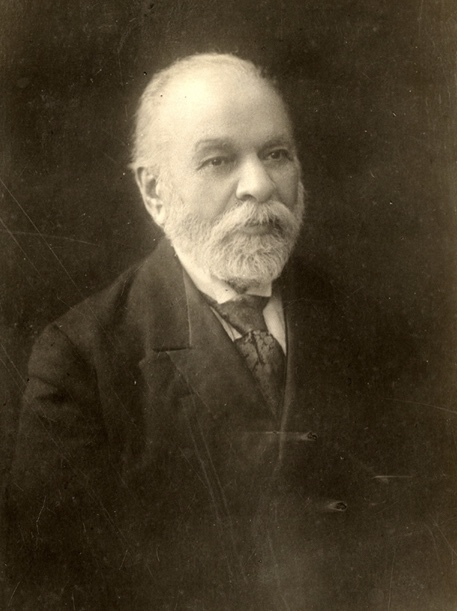
Ismail Kemal of Albania

Ismail Kemal (24 January 1844 – 26 January 1919) was a distinguished leader of the Albanian national movement at the beginning of the 20th century, founder of the modern Albanian state in 1912, and its first prime minister and head of state and government.

=== Andorra ===
The first Co-Princes of Andorra were Roger-Bernard III, Count of Foix and Pere d'Urtx, Bishop of Urgell, who signed the Paréage, which gave them joint sovereignty over Andorra in 1278.

=== Austria ===
Karl Renner, who was the first Chancellor of Austria and the first post-war President of Austria after World War II, is often referred to as the "Father of the Republic" due to his leadership of the First Austrian Republic, and for playing a decisive role in establishing the present Second Austrian republic.

=== Belarus ===
- Kastuś Kalinoŭski was a revolutionary, publicist and poet, as well as one of the leaders of the January Uprising 1863 - 1864 within the Russian Empire on the territory of the former Grand Duchy of Lithuania.
- Janka Kupała was a prominent Belarusian poet and writer of the early 20th century and one of the founders of Belarusian national literature. Author of the slogan Žyvie Bielaruś! ('Long live Belarus!'), which is still used today.
- Vaclaŭ Lastoŭski was a leading figure of the Belarusian independence movement in the early 20th century and served as the Prime Minister of the Belarusian Democratic Republic from 1919 to 1923. As a philologist and self-taught ethnographer, he authored A Short History of Belarus ("Кароткая гісторыя Беларусі"), the country's first comprehensive national history.

=== Belgium ===
Though there is no official founding father of Belgium, the leaders of the Belgian Revolution, Charles Rogier and Erasme Louis Surlet de Chokier, as well as the first King of the Belgians, Leopold I, were key figures in the independence of Belgium from the United Kingdom of the Netherlands.

=== Bosnia and Herzegovina ===
- Tvrtko I of Bosnia was the founder of the first Bosnian Kingdom.
- Husein-kapetan Gradaščević led the revolt against the Ottoman Sultan Mahmud II who fought for an autonomous Bosnian State.

=== Bulgaria ===
Mythical rulers of Bulgaria date back as far as 3rd millennium BC.

==== Medieval ====
- Avitohol (?–453? AD), who researchers claim to be the mythical Attila, is the first name in the Nominalia of the Bulgarian khans. He was from the Dulo clan and was succeeded by his son Ernak or Irnik (the second name mentioned in the Nominalia).
- Kubrat (606–665) was the founder of the powerful Great Bulgaria in 632 AD.
- Asparuh (around 640–701) is the most venerated national founder of Bulgaria. He was a son of Kubrat and started attacking and moving southwest of Old Great Bulgaria, towards the Lower Danube in Southeast Europe. Victorious over the Eastern Roman Empire, he established the First Bulgarian Empire in 680–681. Modern day Bulgaria is a direct successor of this state. Asparukh's brother Batbayan stayed ruling the core territories to the north, while Kotrag migrated further north and founded Volga Bulgaria.
- Krum the Fearsome (8th century – 814) – prominent ruler of the First Bulgarian Empire. During his reign the Bulgarian territory doubled in size, spreading from the middle Danube to the Dnieper and from Odrin to the Tatra Mountains. His able and energetic rule brought law and order to Bulgaria and developed the rudiments of state organization, thus he is regarded as an important national founder.
- Boris I (9th century-2 May 907) officially Christianized Bulgaria in 864, a significant event that shaped the History of Bulgaria and Europe. The historian Steven Runciman called him one of the greatest persons in history. His son and grandson, tsar Simeon I the Great and tsar Petar I, are also considered as having an important role in the formation and strengthening of the Bulgarian state and nationality.
- Samuil (997–1014) – energetic emperor (tsar) that restored Bulgarian might in Southeast Europe, and although the Empire was disestablished after his death, he is regarded as a heroic ruler in Bulgaria, as well as in North Macedonia.
- Ivan Asen I, Peter IV and Kaloyan are the three brothers tsars that reestablished Bulgaria after a major uprising (1185–1204).
- Euthymius of Tarnovo – Patriarch of Bulgaria between 1375 and 1393. Regarded as one of the most important figures of medieval Bulgaria, Euthymius was the last head of the Bulgarian Orthodox Church in the Second Bulgarian Empire. Arguably the best esteemed of all Bulgarian patriarchs, Euthymius was an authoritative figure in the Eastern Orthodox world of the time.

==== Modern ====
- Petar Bogdan (1601–1674)
- Paisius of Hilendar (1722–1773)
- Petar Beron (1799–1871))
- Georgi Rakovski (1821–1867)
- Dragan Tsankov (1828–1911)
- Lyuben Karavelov (1834–1879)
- Vasil Levski (1837–1873)
- Ekzarh Yosif (1840–1915)
- Vasil Drumev (1841–1901)
- Georgi Benkovski (1843–1876)
- Petko Karavelov (1943–1903)
- Hristo Botev (1848–1876)
- Zahari Stoyanov (1850–1889)
- Ivan Vazov (1850–1921)
- Stefan Stambolov (1851–1895)

=== Croatia ===
- Višeslav was one of the first dukes of Croatia, and the early attested by name.
- Tomislav is celebrated as the first king of Croatia and the founder of the first united Croatian state.
- Ante Starčević, has been referred to as Father of the Nation due to his campaign for the rights of Croats within Austria-Hungary and his propagation of a Croatian state in a time where many politicians sought unification with other South Slavs.
- Franjo Tuđman, first President of the Republic of Croatia 1990–99. Sometimes referred to as and self-proclaimed "Father of the Nation".

=== Cyprus ===
Makarios III (1913–1977), archbishop and primate of the autocephalous Eastern Orthodox Church of Cyprus (1950–1977), and first president of Cyprus (1960–1977), is widely regarded by Greek Cypriots as the Father of the Nation or "Ethnarch".

Conversely, Rauf Denktaş (1924–2012), under Makarios III second and last Vice President of Cyprus (1973–1974), and first President of Northern Cyprus (1983–2005), is considered the founding father of Northern Cyprus.

=== Czech Republic ===
- Czech, one of three mythical Slavic brothers who appear together in the Wielkopolska Chronicle, is considered the founder of the Czech nation.
- Bořivoj I, Duke of Bohemia, one of the first monarchs of the Duchy of Bohemia and the early attested by name.
- Wenceslaus I, Duke of Bohemia, main patron saint of the country. Anniversary of his murder on 28 September is celebrated as Statehood Day.
- Charles IV, Holy Roman Emperor, King of Bohemia, who is known under honorific title Father of the Homeland.
- František Palacký, politician and historian, influential in Czech National Revival movement, known by title Father of the Nation.
- Tomáš Masaryk, founder and first president of Czechoslovakia, which independence on 28 October 1918 is today celebrated on Independence Day.
- Václav Havel, founder of the Civic Forum party that played a major role in the Velvet Revolution that in 1989 toppled the Communist system in Czechoslovakia, was the last (and first democratically elected) president of Czechoslovakia from 1989 until the dissolution of Czechoslovakia in 1992, and the first president of the Czech Republic from 1993 to 2003.

=== Denmark ===
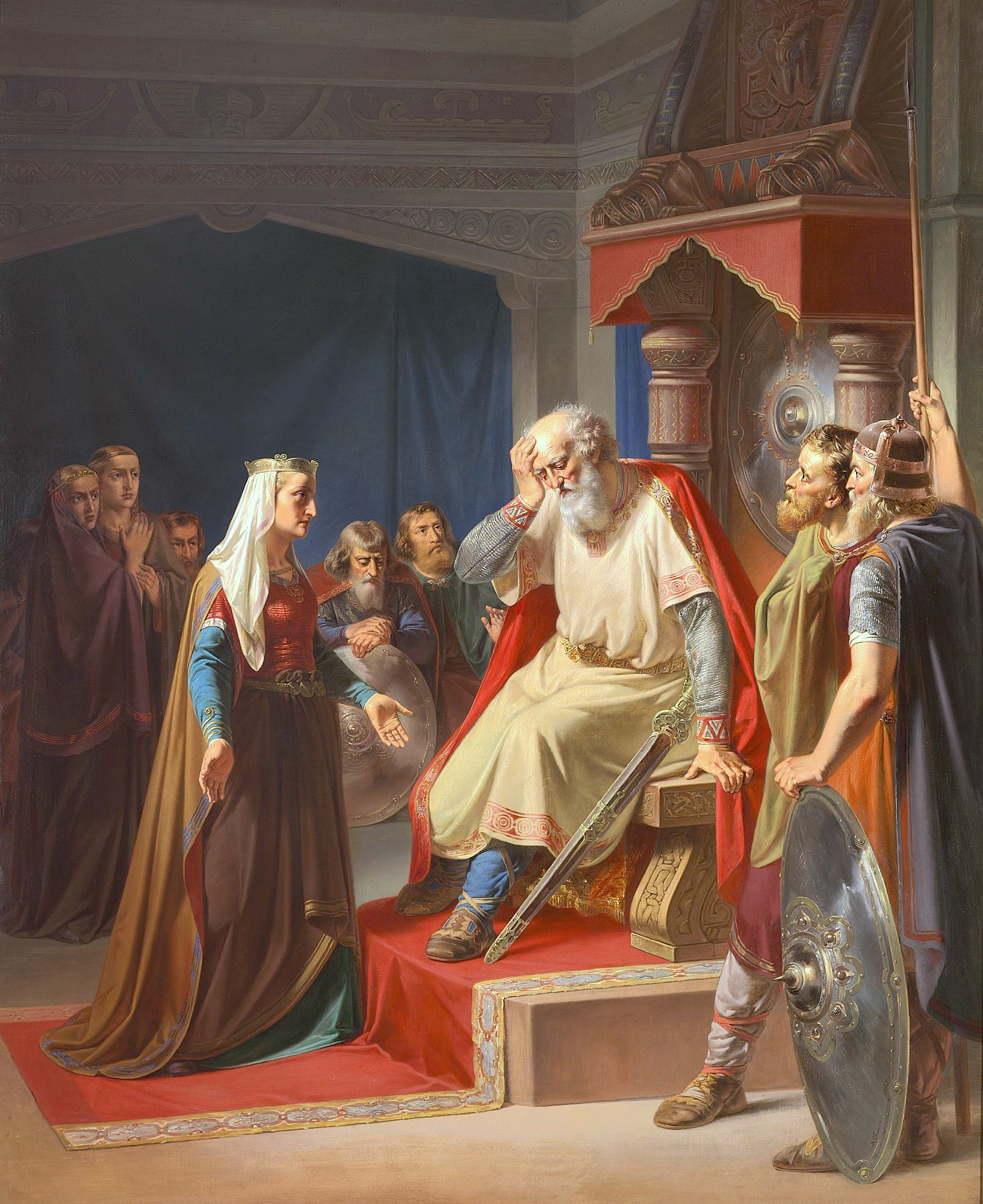
Gorm the Old

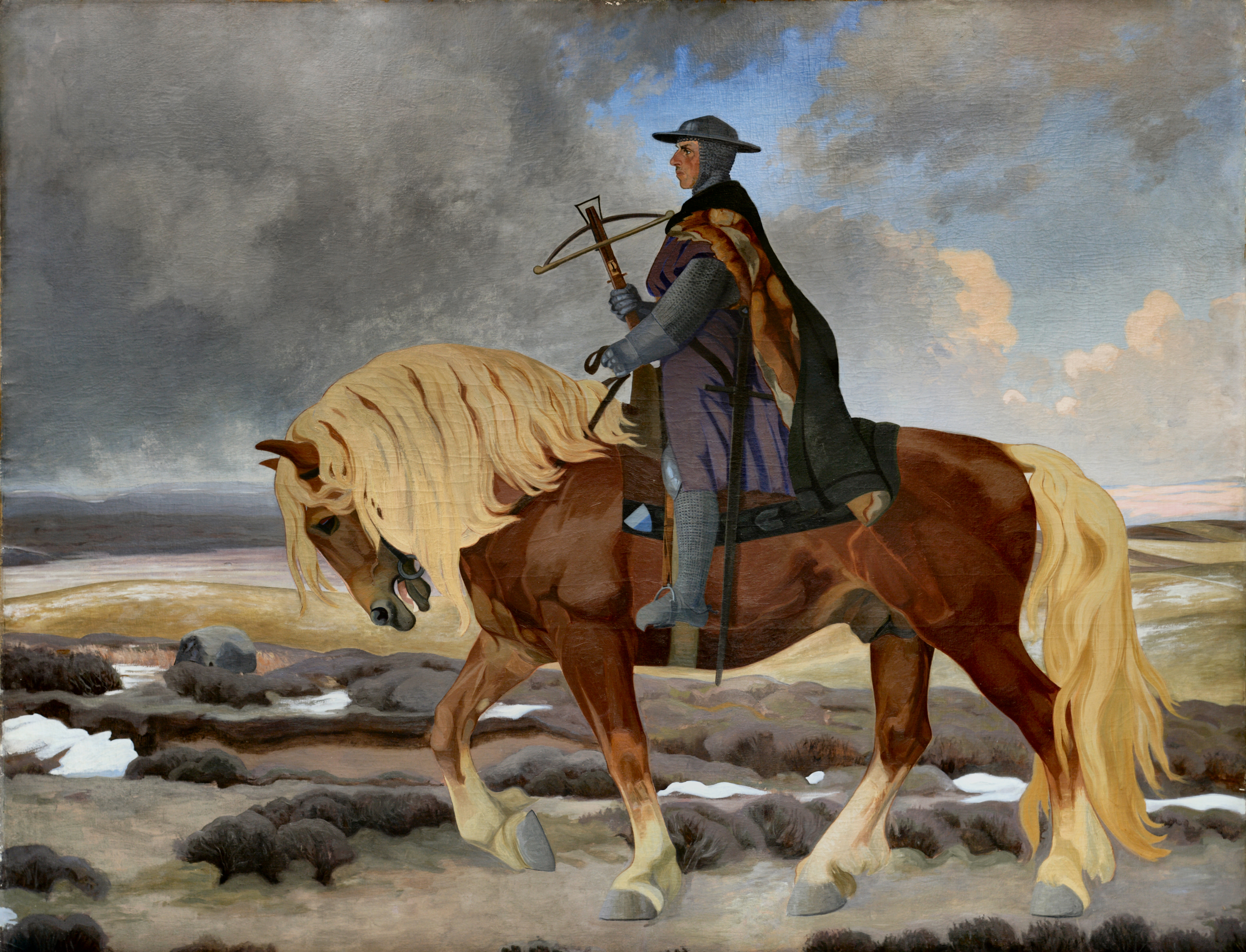
Niels Ebbesen (1308 – 21 November 1340)

- Dan (or Halfdan) is the name of the legendary earliest king of the Danes and Denmark, mentioned in medieval Scandinavian texts. He is said to be the progenitor of the nation and the Danish Royal House according to Saxo Grammaticus's Gesta Danorum.
- Gorm the Old, the first recorded ruler of Denmark, reigning from c. 936 to his death c. 958. The current King Frederik X of Denmark can trace his heritage back to Gorm the Old. He is called the founder of the kingdom of Denmark, though at the time he did not control the whole country, only Jutland.
- Harald Bluetooth was the son of Gorm the old and the first to unite Denmark into a single country by uniting the tribes. Harald ruled as king of Denmark from c. 958 – c. 986. He was baptized and the first Christian king of Denmark and helped Christianize the Danes, which is proclaimed on the Jelling stone.
- Niels Ebbesen was a Danish squire and national hero who liberated Denmark, which had been patented away to German barons and landlords. He is known for his killing of Gerhard III, Count of Holstein-Rendsburg in 1340, and in doing so returning control of Jutland and Funen back to the Danish king.

=== Estonia ===
Edgar Savisaar served as first post-Soviet Prime Minister of Estonia from 1991 to 1992.

=== Finland ===
Pehr Evind Svinhufvud served as first Prime Minister of Finland from 1917 to 1918.

=== France ===
Unlike states created by a single act of independence, France is generally treated by historians as the product of a long process of political formation rather than of one founding moment. Classical French historiography has often dated the kingdom from Clovis I and the later Capetian monarchy from Hugh Capet, while modern republican memory emphasizes 1789, 1870–75 and 1958. "History of France". Encyclopædia Britannica. The figures below are therefore those most frequently cited for having unified territory, created lasting institutions, or established a durable regime.

Vercingetorix (d. 46 BC), a chieftain of the Arverni, united a coalition of Gallic peoples against Julius Caesar during the last phase of the Gallic Wars and was defeated at the Battle of Alesia in 52 BC. Caesar, Julius. "7". Commentarii de Bello Gallico. He was not the founder of a French state, which did not then exist, but nineteenth-century nationalist historiography recast him as a precursor of national resistance and of a Gallic origin for France. Dietler, Michael (1994). "Our Ancestors the Gauls": Archaeology, Ethnic Nationalism, and the Manipulation of Celtic Identity in Modern Europe. American Anthropologist.

Clovis I (c. 466–511), King of the Salian Franks and, after 509, of the Franks as a whole, defeated the last Roman authority in northern Gaul at Soissons (486) and later the Visigoths at Vouillé (507). His baptism into Catholic (Nicene) Christianity, traditionally dated to Reims around 496–508, aligned the Frankish monarchy with the Gallo-Roman Church and distinguished it from Arian rival kingdoms. Gregory of Tours. "2". Historia Francorum."Clovis I". Encyclopædia Britannica. Later royal ideology treated this conversion and the unification of Frankish Gaul as the religious and political beginning of the French monarchy. Wood, Ian (1994). The Merovingian Kingdoms, 450–751. Longman.

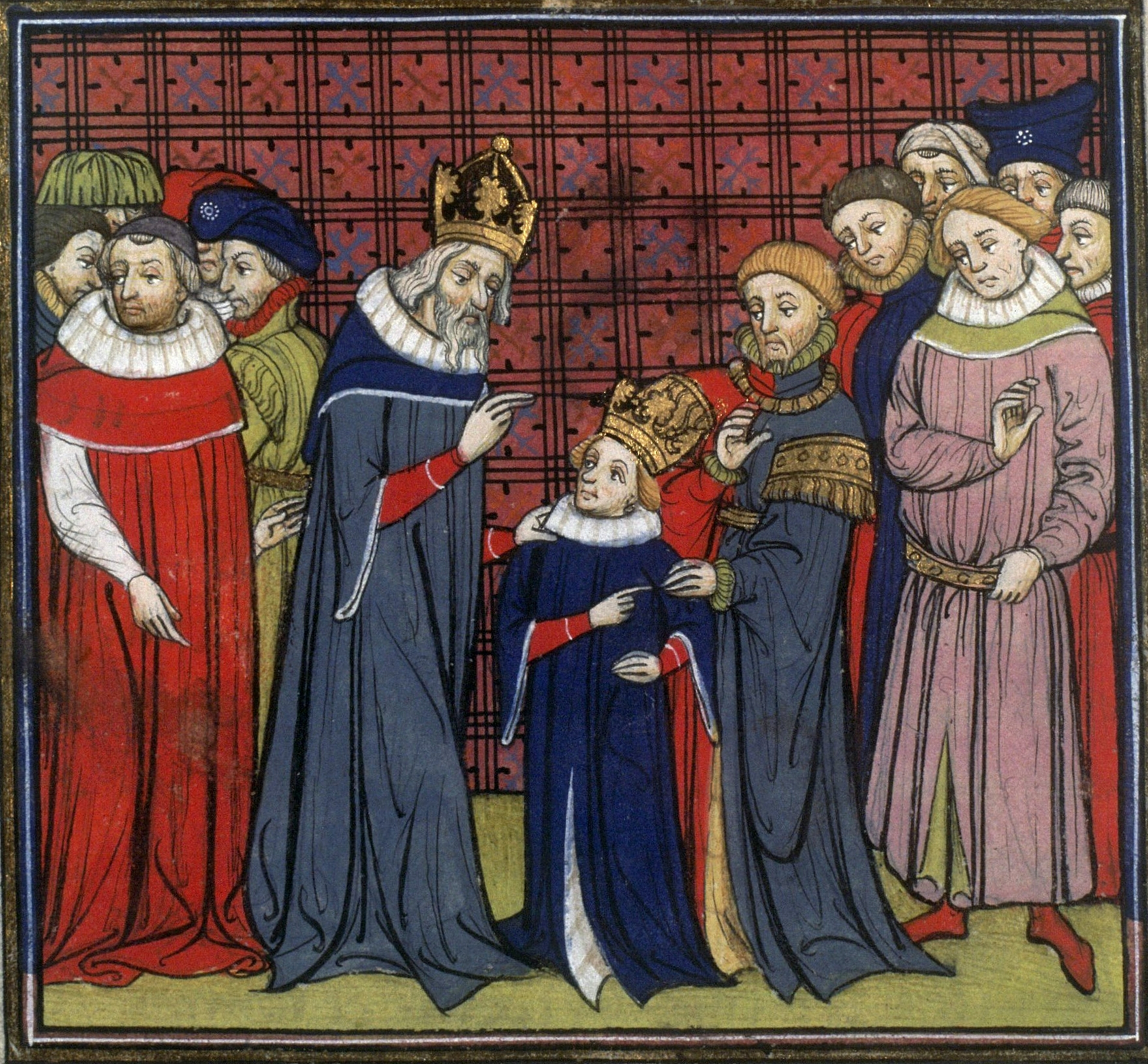
Charlemagne and his son Louis Le Pieux.

Charlemagne (748–814), King of the Franks from 768 and Holy Roman Emperor from 800, expanded Frankish rule across much of western and central Europe and organized it through counts, missi dominici, written capitularies and a revival of Latin learning. His imperial coronation on 25 December 800 associated Frankish kingship with a restored western empire. McKitterick, Rosamond (2008). Charlemagne: The Formation of a European Identity. Cambridge University Press. After the Treaty of Verdun (843), the western third of that empire became West Francia, the territorial core from which the later kingdom of France developed. Charlemagne is therefore claimed both as a founding figure of France and, more broadly, of medieval Europe."Charlemagne". Encyclopædia Britannica.

Hugh Capet (c. 940–996), Duke of the Franks and King from 987, was elected after the death of the last effective West Frankish Carolingian, Louis V. His accession founded the Capetian dynasty, whose direct and collateral lines (Valois, Bourbon, Orléans) furnished almost every subsequent French monarch until 1848. "Hugh Capet". Encyclopædia Britannica. From a restricted domain around Paris and Orléans, the Capetians gradually transformed a fragmented feudal kingship into a hereditary territorial monarchy. Many historians therefore treat 987, rather than 481 or 800, as the institutional beginning of the kingdom of France. Dunbabin, Jean (2000). France in the Making, 843–1180. Oxford University Press.

Louis IX (1214–1270), canonized in 1297 as Saint Louis, consolidated Capetian authority after the territorial gains of Philip II Augustus. He specialized the royal court into a judicial parlement, encouraged written custom and royal ordonnances, sent enquêteurs to correct abuses by royal officers, restricted private war, and made royal justice more widely available on appeal. "Louis IX". Encyclopædia Britannica."Parlement". Encyclopædia Britannica. The resulting image of the king as supreme justiciar, later fixed in the legend of the oak of Vincennes, became a central model of French public authority. His reign is often described as a decisive stage in the making of a royal state rather than a merely feudal lordship. Le Goff, Jacques (2009). Saint Louis. University of Notre Dame Press.

Cardinal Richelieu (Armand Jean du Plessis, 1585–1642), chief minister of Louis XIII from 1624, subordinated aristocratic and Huguenot military power to the crown after the siege of La Rochelle and advanced the doctrine of raison d'État. He made more systematic use of royal commissioners, the future intendants, to supervise justice, police and finance in the provinces, and built a royal navy and a more permanent war administration. Bonney, Richard (1978). Political Change in France under Richelieu and Mazarin, 1624–1661. Oxford University Press.Parrott, David (2001). Richelieu's Army. Cambridge University Press. Historians debate how complete this centralization was, but Richelieu is widely credited with shifting France from a composite monarchy toward a bureaucratic royal state later inherited by Louis XIV and, in altered form, by the modern prefectural administration. Collins, James B. (2009). The State in Early Modern France. Cambridge University Press.

Louis XIV (1638–1715), king from 1643 and personal ruler from 1661, gave that state its classic monarchical form. After the shock of the Fronde, he refused to appoint a first minister of princely rank, concentrated decision-making in small councils, and used intendants and the financial administration of Jean-Baptiste Colbert to tighten fiscal and economic control. "Louis XIV". Encyclopædia Britannica. The court installed at Versailles from 1682 domesticated the high nobility and made the king the visible centre of government, ceremony and patronage. Colbert's mercantilist manufactures, trading companies and naval programme also expanded the kingdom's administrative and colonial reach. Louis XIV did not create France, but he fixed the template of a centralized, dynastic great power against which later regimes defined themselves. Bluche, François (1990). Louis XIV. Franklin Watts.

Maximilien Robespierre (1758–1794) was a leading Jacobin deputy, a defender of the Declaration of the Rights of Man and of the Citizen and, from July 1793, the most prominent member of the Committee of Public Safety. The First Republic had already been proclaimed on 21 September 1792 by the National Convention, but under the committee the revolutionary government was organized as a wartime executive: levée en masse, price controls, a revolutionary tribunal and the suspension of the Constitution of 1793. "Maximilien Robespierre". Encyclopædia Britannica.Palmer, R. R. (1941). Twelve Who Ruled. Princeton University Press. Robespierre's role is therefore double and contested. Republican memory has sometimes treated him as a founder of popular sovereignty, universal male suffrage in 1793 and the modern language of the rights of man; liberal and conservative historiography has instead identified him with the Reign of Terror and with the execution of political opponents, which ended with his own fall on 9 Thermidor Year II (27 July 1794). McPhee, Peter (2012). Robespierre: A Revolutionary Life. Yale University Press. He is better described as a founder of the revolutionary republic's emergency state than as a founder of France as a nation.

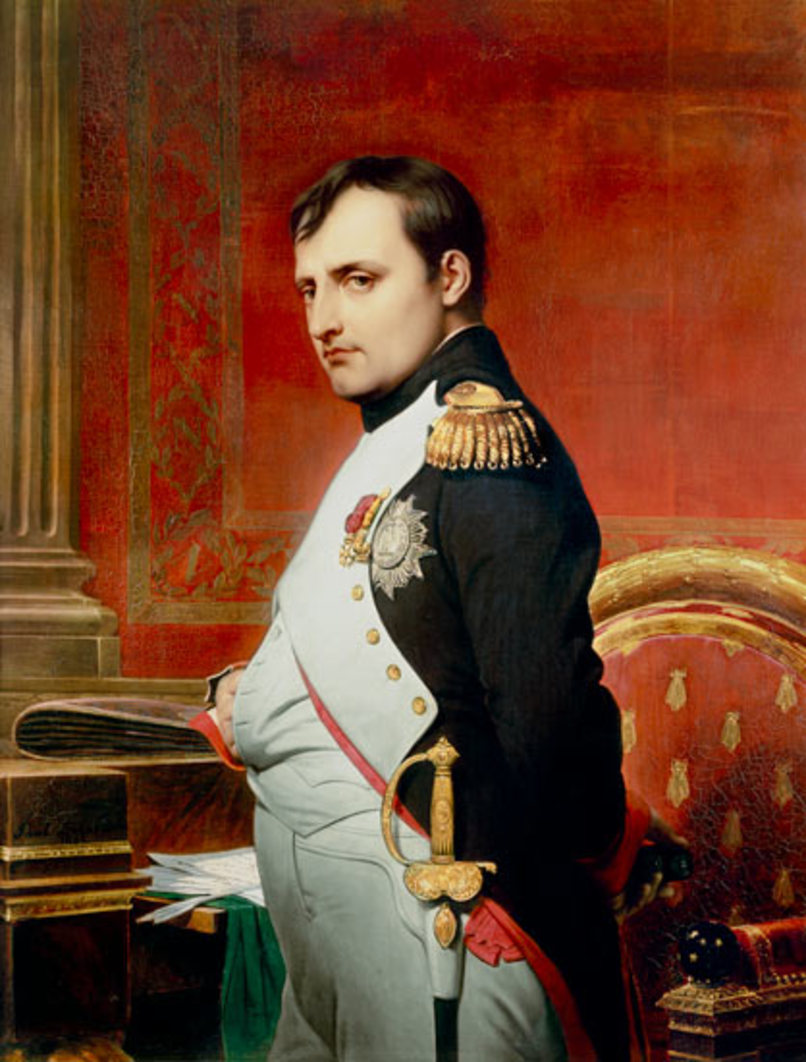
Napoléon I

Napoleon I (Napoleon Bonaparte, 1769–1821), First Consul from 1799 to 1804, first President of the Italian Republic (1802–1805), Emperor of the French from 1804 to 1814 and in 1815, King of Italy (1805–1814), first imposed himself through a succession of campaigns that made the revolutionary armies the dominant land force in Europe, with the aim of countering the royalist crackdown on republican movements following the French Revolution and the downfall of the Bourbon. In Italy in 1796–97 he defeated the Austrians at Montenotte, Lodi, Arcole and Rivoli, forcing the Treaty of Campo Formio; in 1800 the crossing of the Alps and the victory at Marengo secured the consulate. "Napoleon I". Encyclopædia Britannica. After the rupture of the Peace of Amiens he destroyed the Third Coalition at Ulm and, on 2 December 1805, at Austerlitz, then broke Prussia at Jena (1806) and Russia at Friedland (1807), imposing the Treaties of Tilsit. In 1809 he again defeated Austria at Wagram. These victories redrew the map of Germany and Italy, created satellite kingdoms and, inside France, gave the post-revolutionary state the prestige and the breathing space needed to last. Esdaile, Charles (2008). Napoleon's Wars: An International History, 1803–1815. Penguin.Chandler, David G. (1966). The Campaigns of Napoleon. Scribner. The later disasters in Spain and Russia, Leipzig (1813) and Waterloo (1815) ended the Empire, but they did not erase the institutional settlement that accompanied the years of victory: the Civil Code of 1804, the Conseil d'État, the prefects, the Banque de France, the lycées, the Legion of Honour and the Concordat of 1801 reorganized law, administration, education, finance and church-state relations on national lines. Woloch, Isser (2001). Napoleon and His Collaborators. W. W. Norton. It is this combination of military hegemony and durable state-building, rather than the imperial title alone, that explains Napoleon's place among France's modern founders.

Napoleon III (Louis-Napoléon Bonaparte, 1808–1873) was the first President of the French Republic (1848–1852) and the last monarch of France as Emperor of the French (1852–1870). His claim as a national founder is narrower than that of Napoleon I: he established the first mass-suffrage presidency and, during the Second Empire, accelerated banking, railways, ports, industries and the rebuilding of Paris, but his regime collapsed at Sedan and did not create the republican institutions that followed. "Napoleon III". Encyclopædia Britannica.

Adolphe Thiers (1797–1877), historian, minister of the July Monarchy and opponent of Napoleon III, became "chief of the executive power of the French Republic" on 17 February 1871 and President of the Republic by the Rivet Law of 31 August 1871. "Adolphe Thiers". Encyclopædia Britannica. He negotiated peace after defeat by Prussia, secured the withdrawal of German occupation by rapid payment of the indemnity, and imposed a conservative republican settlement after the suppression of the Paris Commune. Although the Constitutional Laws of 1875 were voted after his resignation in 1873, Thiers had already made the republic a functioning government and argued that it was "the regime that divides us least." He is therefore commonly described as a founder, and the first president, of the French Third Republic, the longest-lived modern French regime before 1958. "L'Assemblée nationale entre 1871 et 1873 – Le « Gouvernement Thiers »". Assemblée nationale.

Charles de Gaulle (1890–1970) refused the armistice of 1940, organized Free France from London, Brazzaville and Algiers, and, after the Liberation, headed the provisional government. He resigned in 1946 rather than accept the parliamentary constitution of the Fourth Republic, then returned in the crisis of May 1958. The constitution approved by referendum on 28 September 1958 and promulgated on 4 October 1958 created the French Fifth Republic, with a strengthened presidency, the power of dissolution and, from 1962, direct election of the president. "Constitution de la Ve République". FranceArchives."Charles de Gaulle". Encyclopædia Britannica. As leader of wartime resistance and as the principal architect of the regime still in force, de Gaulle is the modern figure most widely accepted as a founder of contemporary France. Jackson, Julian (2018). A Certain Idea of France: The Life of Charles de Gaulle. Allen Lane.

=== Georgia ===
- Pharnavaz I (329—237 BC), first monarch of the Kingdom of Iberia
- Bagrat III (960–1014), first monarch of the united Kingdom of Georgia
- Noe Ramishvili (1881–1930), first Prime Minister of the Democratic Republic of Georgia
- Zviad Gamsakhurdia (1939–1993), first President of Georgia

=== Germany ===
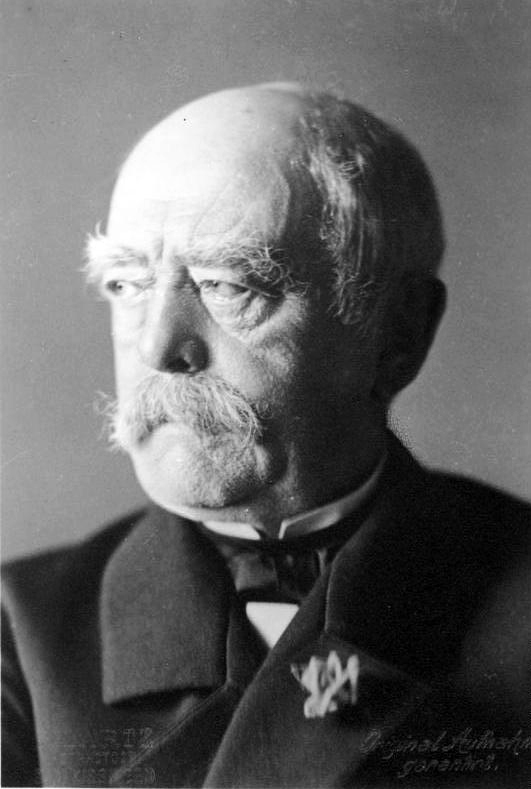
Otto von Bismarck

Unlike states created by a single declaration of independence, Germany is the product of successive political forms: the East Frankish kingdom, the Holy Roman Empire, the German Confederation, the German Empire of 1871, the Weimar Republic, the divided Federal Republic and German Democratic Republic, and the unified Federal Republic after 1990. Nineteenth-century nationalists therefore looked for medieval or ancient "founders," while modern constitutional history dates the present state from 1949 and 1990. Fulbrook, Mary (2015). A History of Germany 1918–2014 (4th ed.). Wiley-Blackwell.Clark, Christopher (2006). Iron Kingdom: The Rise and Downfall of Prussia, 1600–1947. Allen Lane.

Arminius (c. 18 BC – AD 21), a Cheruscan chieftain trained in Roman service, destroyed three Roman legions under Publius Quinctilius Varus in the Battle of the Teutoburg Forest in AD 9 and thereby halted Roman conquest east of the Rhine. "Arminius". Encyclopædia Britannica. He founded no German state. From the Renaissance, and especially after the rediscovery of Tacitus's Germania, humanist and later nationalist writers recast him as "Hermann the Liberator," a legendary ancestor of the German nation. The cult peaked in the nineteenth century with the Hermannsdenkmal and has no institutional continuity with later German governments. Krebs, Christopher B. (2011). A Most Dangerous Book: Tacitus's Germania from the Roman Empire to the Third Reich. W. W. Norton.

Charlemagne (748–814), King of the Franks and Emperor from 800, conquered the Saxons and incorporated much of what later became Germany into a renewed western empire. After the Treaty of Verdun (843), the eastern third of that empire survived as East Francia, the usual starting point of medieval German kingship. McKitterick, Rosamond (2008). Charlemagne: The Formation of a European Identity. Cambridge University Press. Charlemagne is therefore a shared founding figure of France, Germany and the idea of a Christian West, not the founder of a German nation-state.

Henry the Fowler (c. 876–936), Duke of Saxony, was elected King of East Francia at Fritzlar in 919, the first non-Frank on that throne. He brought Swabia and Bavaria into a working royal confederation, recovered Lotharingia (925), fortified Saxony against Magyar raids and won at Riade in 933. "Henry I". Encyclopædia Britannica. He treated the realm as a union of stem duchies rather than as a centralized nation, but later German historiography, from the humanists to Friedrich Ludwig Jahn and nineteenth-century nationalists, often called him the founder of the medieval German kingdom and of the Ottonian dynasty. Reuter, Timothy (1991). Germany in the Early Middle Ages, c. 800–1056. Longman.

Otto I ("the Great," 912–973), Henry's son, was crowned King at Aachen in 936 and Emperor of the Holy Roman Empire in Rome on 2 February 962. Victory over the Magyars at the Battle of Lechfeld (955) secured the eastern frontier; the imperial coronation bound German kingship to a renewed Roman-Christian empire that lasted, in altered form, until 1806. "Otto I". Encyclopædia Britannica. Otto did not create a nation-state, but he established the Ottonian imperial order that structured German political life for centuries and made the German king the usual bearer of the western imperial title. Keller, Hagen (2002). Ottonische Königsherrschaft. Wissenschaftliche Buchgesellschaft.

Frederick I Barbarossa (c. 1122–1190) reasserted imperial authority in Germany and Italy and became, far more than a constitutional founder, the object of a later national myth. From the late Middle Ages a legend held that he slept in the Kyffhäuser and would return in Germany's greatest need. Munz, Peter (1969). Frederick Barbarossa: A Study in Medieval Politics. Eyre & Spottiswoode. Nineteenth-century nationalists and, later, the German Empire and the Nazi regime appropriated the story: Wilhelm I was sometimes hailed as Barbarossa reborn, and in 1937 Hitler praised the emperor as a model of Germanic imperial mission, naming the 1941 invasion of the Soviet Union "Barbarossa." The myth illustrates how medieval emperors were recruited as national founders; it does not make Barbarossa the architect of a modern German state.

Otto von Bismarck (1815–1898), Minister-president of Prussia from 1862 and first Chancellor of the German Empire, created the first German nation-state by excluding Austria and federating the remaining states around Prussia. After the Danish War (1864), the Austro-Prussian War (1866) and the North German Confederation of 1867, the southern states joined following the Franco-Prussian War. On 18 January 1871 Wilhelm I was proclaimed German Emperor in the Hall of Mirrors at Versailles (France); Bismarck read the proclamation. "Otto von Bismarck". Encyclopædia Britannica.Pflanze, Otto (1990). Bismarck and the Development of Germany. Princeton University Press. The 1871 constitution combined a hereditary Hohenzollern emperor, a federal Bundesrat and a Reichstag elected by universal male suffrage. Bismarck also introduced pioneering social insurance in the 1880s. Unification was "from above," Prussian and monarchical; liberals who had hoped for a parliamentary nation in 1848 obtained a powerful empire rather than a democratic one. Wilhelm I was the first German Kaiser, but the political design of 1866–71 was Bismarck's. Steinberg, Jonathan (2011). Bismarck: A Life. Oxford University Press.

Friedrich Ebert (1871–1925), chairman of the SPD, headed the Council of the People's Deputies after the November Revolution of 1918 and was elected first Reich President by the Weimar National Assembly on 11 February 1919. "21. August 1919: Friedrich Ebert als erster Reichspräsident vereidigt". Deutscher Bundestag. The Weimar Constitution of 11 August 1919 replaced the monarchy with a democratic republic, universal suffrage including women, and a directly elected presidency. Ebert's pact with the army command preserved the new state against both communist risings and right-wing putsches, at the cost of leaving key imperial elites in place. He is the founder of Germany's first lasting democratic constitution, even though that republic collapsed in 1933. Mühlhausen, Walter (2006). Friedrich Ebert 1871–1925. Dietz. Modern democratic Germany was constitutionally founded in 1948–49. The Herrenchiemsee convention (10–23 August 1948) drafted guidelines for a federal Basic Law; the Parlamentarischer Rat, chaired by Konrad Adenauer with Carlo Schmid heading the main committee, adopted the Basic Law on 8 May 1949. It entered into force on 23 May 1949. "Herrenchiemseer Konvent / Parlamentarischer Rat". Deutscher Bundestag. The text made human dignity inviolable (Article 1), bound legislation to constitutional rights, entrenched federalism and created a chancellor-centred parliamentary system designed to avoid both Weimar instability and National Socialist dictatorship. Adenauer, first federal chancellor (1949–1963), anchored the new republic in the West through the ECSC, NATO membership and the Wirtschaftswunder, while leaving unification as a constitutional goal rather than an immediate programme. "Konrad Adenauer". Encyclopædia Britannica.Schwarz, Hans-Peter (1995). Konrad Adenauer: A German Politician and Statesman in a Period of War, Revolution and Reconstruction. Berghahn.

Helmut Kohl (1930–2017), federal chancellor from 1982 to 1998, was the principal West German architect of reunification. After the peaceful revolution in the GDR, whose slogan Wir sind das Volk! ("We are the people!") rejected the ruling party's claim to speak for the people, Kohl set out a ten-point programme on 28 November 1989. The GDR acceded to the Federal Republic under Article 23 of the Basic Law; economic union took effect on 1 July 1990 and political unity on 3 October 1990, after the Two Plus Four Treaty had ended residual Allied rights. "Helmut Kohl". Encyclopædia Britannica. Kohl did not found a new constitution: the Basic Law of 1949 became the constitution of the united state. Together with the East German civic movement of 1989–90, he is the founder of the Federal Republic in its present territorial form. Garton Ash, Timothy (1993). In Europe's Name: Germany and the Divided Continent. Random House.

=== Greece ===
==== Ancient ====
- Hellen, mythical progenitor of the Greeks, who gives his name to both the people and the country in the Greek language.
- Theseus, semi-legendary founder-hero of Athens
- Solon (594 BC) and Cleisthenes (508/7 BC), inventors of democracy and founders of the Athenian constitution.
- Lycurgus of Sparta, founder of the Spartan constitution
- Cadmus, founder and first King of Thebes.

==== Modern ====
- Adamantios Korais, Theophilos Kairis and other figures of the Greek Enlightenment who contributed to the country's national awakening leading up to its revolution against the Ottoman Empire
- Rigas Feraios, writer and revolutionary who is remembered as a national hero and the first victim of the uprising against the Ottomans.
- Theodoros Kolokotronis, Georgios Karaiskakis, Andreas Vokos Miaoulis, Laskarina Bouboulina, Yannis Makriyannis and other military leaders of the Greek War of Independence
- Alexandros Mavrokordatos, President of the First National Assembly at Epidaurus, co-author of the Greek Declaration of Independence and first Provisional Constitution and first head of government (President of the Executive) of Modern Greece.
- Ioannis Kapodistrias, first head of state of independent Greece (1827–1831) and founder of the modern Greek state
- Eleftherios Venizelos, eight-time Prime Minister of Greece, has been labelled as "The Maker of Modern Greece" and is still widely known as the "Ethnarch".

=== Hungary ===
According to Anonymus the fejedelem who made the Hungarians settle into the Carpathian Basin in 896 AD was Árpád, who was said to have descended from Prince Csaba, the forefather of the nation. He was elected nagyfejedelem (grand prince), and created a coherent Hungarian state in and around the Pannonian Basin and mingled with the inhabitants. His dynasty reigned over the Hungarian Kingdom from the 9th century until 1301. In Hungary Stephen I of Hungary is commonly regarded as the founder of the nation. He was Hungary's first king and united the Magyar people into the Kingdom of Hungary.Coloman the Learned first entered into a personal union with Croatia, bringing prosperity to the nations. Post-arpadian king Louis the Great established Hungary as a European power, and is remembered as a "knightking" for his military excellence. Among others, his military achievements include being the first European monarch to defeat an Ottoman imperial army in battle. The Habsburg era also gave rise to many great figures, such as Lajos Kossuth the Pater Patriae of Hungary. He is known as the leader of the Hungarian Revolution of 1848 against the Habsburgs, being the creator of the April Laws (and an unenacted constitution) and helping in the establishment of the Hungarian State and therefore being founder of modern Hungary. An equally important figure is Ferenc Deák, one of the initiators of the Compromise, whose efforts led to the reunification of the Lands of the Holy Crown in 1868. Hungarian prime minister Mihály Károlyi would later be the one to officially dissolve the Austro-Hungarian Empire, creating a free Hungarian republic.

=== Iceland ===
Jón Sigurðsson was the leader of the 19th century Icelandic independence movement. He was the first president of the Althingi, restored as a legislative branch in 1875.

=== Ireland ===
The Irish Free State was established after the Irish War of Independence (1919–21), in which Éamon de Valera, Cathal Brugha and Michael Collins were key leaders. However, they became antagonists in the Irish Civil War (1922–23), in which Collins and Brugha were killed and de Valera defeated. For decades, the inheritors of the opposing factions bypassed these sensitivities to honour the earlier leaders of the Easter Rising of 1916, in particular the seven signatories of the Proclamation of the Irish Republic: Patrick Pearse, James Connolly, Éamonn Ceannt, Tom Clarke, Seán Mac Diarmada, Thomas MacDonagh, and Joseph Plunkett.

=== Italy ===
==== Ancient ====
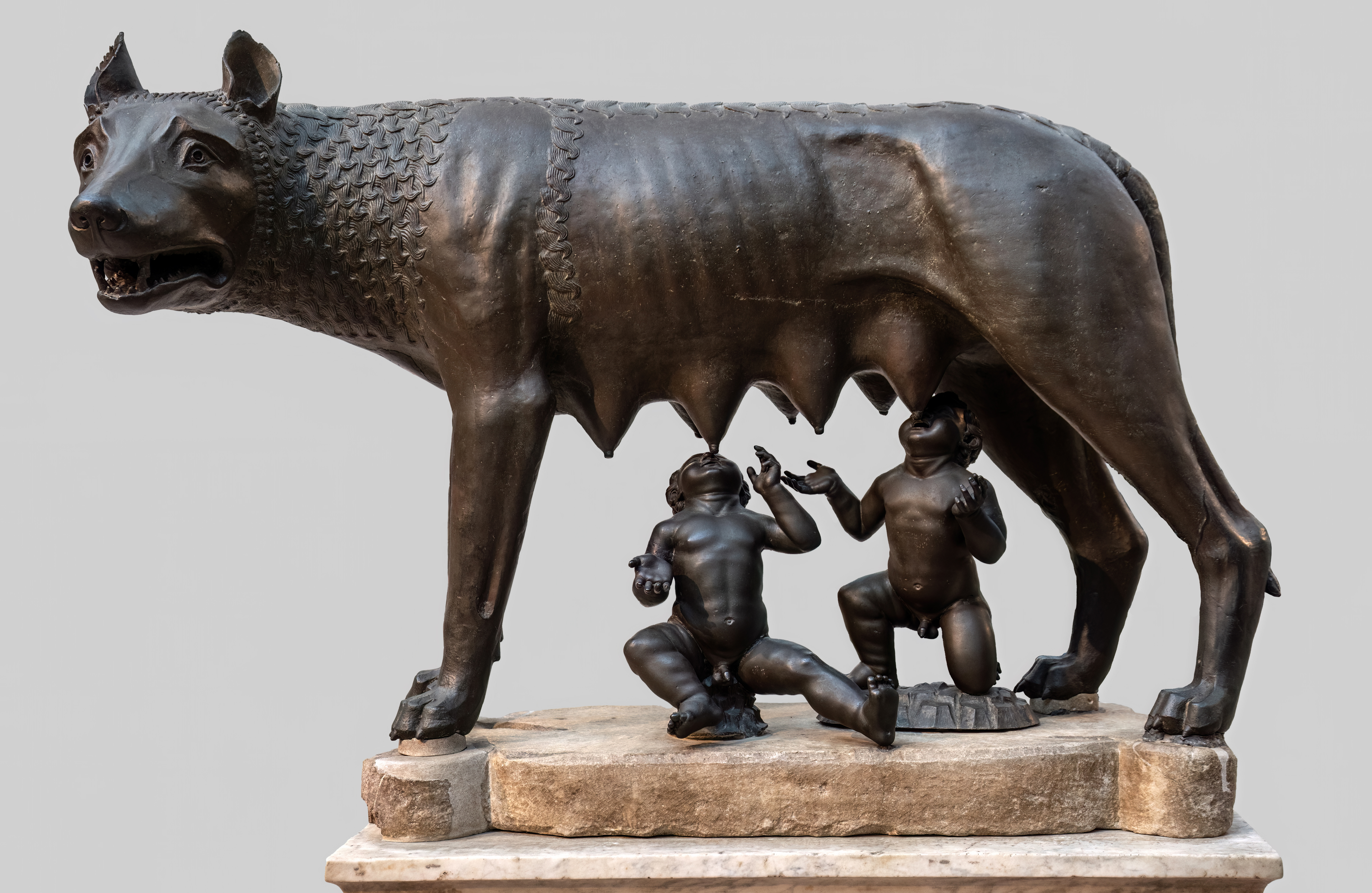
The Capitoline Wolf, arguably the most famous statue of the she-wolf. In the Roman foundation myth, the she-wolf (lupa in Italian) was an Italian wolf who nursed and sheltered the twins Romulus and Remus. Romulus would later become the founder and first king of Rome.

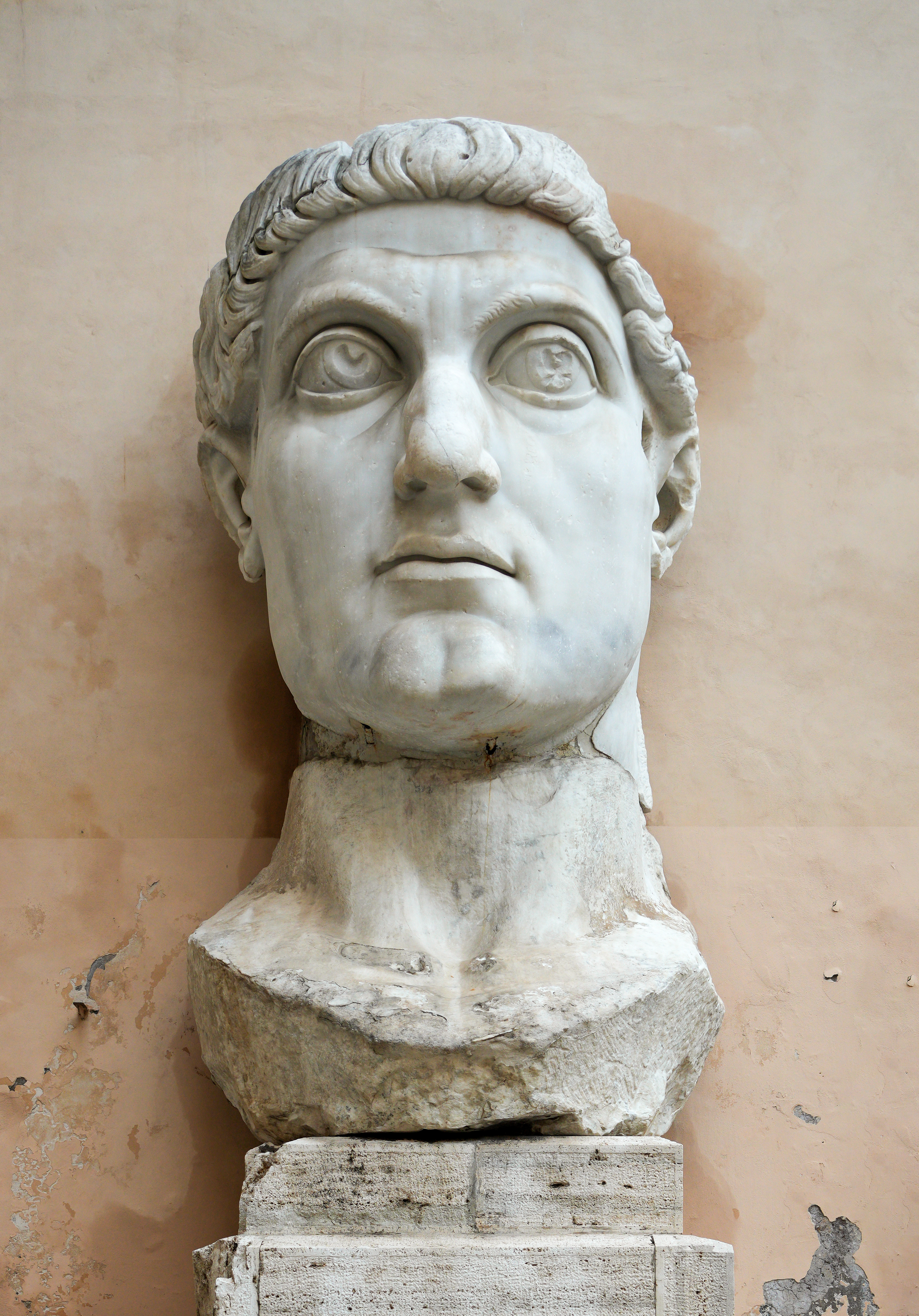
Constantine the Great played a pivotal role in elevating the status of Christianity in Rome, decriminalizing Christian practice and ceasing Christian persecution in a period referred to as the Constantinian shift.

- Romulus, was the legendary founder and first king of Rome, the capital of Italy. Roman myth held that their city was founded by Romulus, son of the war god Mars and the Vestal virgin Rhea Silvia, fallen princess of Alba Longa and descendant of Aeneas of Troy. Exposed on the Tiber river, Romulus and his twin Remus were suckled by a she-wolf at the Lupercal before being raised by the shepherd Faustulus, taking revenge on their usurping great-uncle Amulius, and restoring Alba Longa to their grandfather Numitor. The brothers then decided to establish a new town but quarrelled over some details, ending with Remus's murder and the establishment of Rome on the Palatine Hill.
- Julius Caesar was a Roman general and statesman. A member of the First Triumvirate, Caesar led the Roman armies in the Gallic Wars before defeating his political rival Pompey in a civil war, and subsequently became dictator from 49 BC until his assassination in 44 BC. He played a critical role in the events that led to the demise of the Roman Republic and the rise of the Roman Empire. After assuming control of government, Caesar began a program of social and governmental reforms, including the creation of the Julian calendar. He gave citizenship to many residents of far regions of the Roman Republic. He initiated land reform and support for veterans.
- Scipio Africanus – he was a Roman general and statesman, most notable as one of the main architects of Rome's victory against Carthage in the Second Punic War. Often regarded as one of the best military commanders and strategists of all time, his greatest military achievement was the defeat of Hannibal at the Battle of Zama in 202 BC. This victory in Africa earned him the epithet Africanus, literally meaning "the African", but meant to be understood as a conqueror of Africa. Scipio Africanus is mentioned in Il Canto degli Italiani, the national anthem of Italy since 1946.
- Augustus was the founder of the Roman Empire. He reigned as the first Roman emperor from 27 BC until his death in AD 14. The reign of Augustus initiated an imperial cult, as well as an era of imperial peace (the Pax Romana or Pax Augusta) in which the Roman world was largely free of armed conflict. The Principate system of government was established during his reign and lasted until the Crisis of the Third Century. Augustus dramatically enlarged the empire, annexing Egypt, Dalmatia, Pannonia, Noricum, and Raetia, expanding possessions in Africa, and completing the conquest of Hispania, but he suffered a major setback in Germania. Beyond the frontiers, he secured the empire with a buffer region of client states and made peace with the Parthian Empire through diplomacy. He reformed the Roman system of taxation, developed networks of roads with an official courier system, established a standing army, established the Praetorian Guard as well as official police and fire-fighting services for Rome, and rebuilt much of the city during his reign.
- Constantine the Great was a Roman emperor from AD 306 to 337 and the first Roman emperor to convert to Christianity. He played a pivotal role in elevating the status of Christianity in Rome, decriminalizing Christian practice and ceasing Christian persecution in a period referred to as the Constantinian shift. This initiated the cessation of the established ancient Roman religion. Constantine is also the originator of the religiopolitical ideology known as Constantinianism, which epitomizes the unity of church and state, as opposed to separation of church and state. He founded the city of Constantinople and made it the capital of the Empire, which remained so for over a millennium.

==== Medieval ====
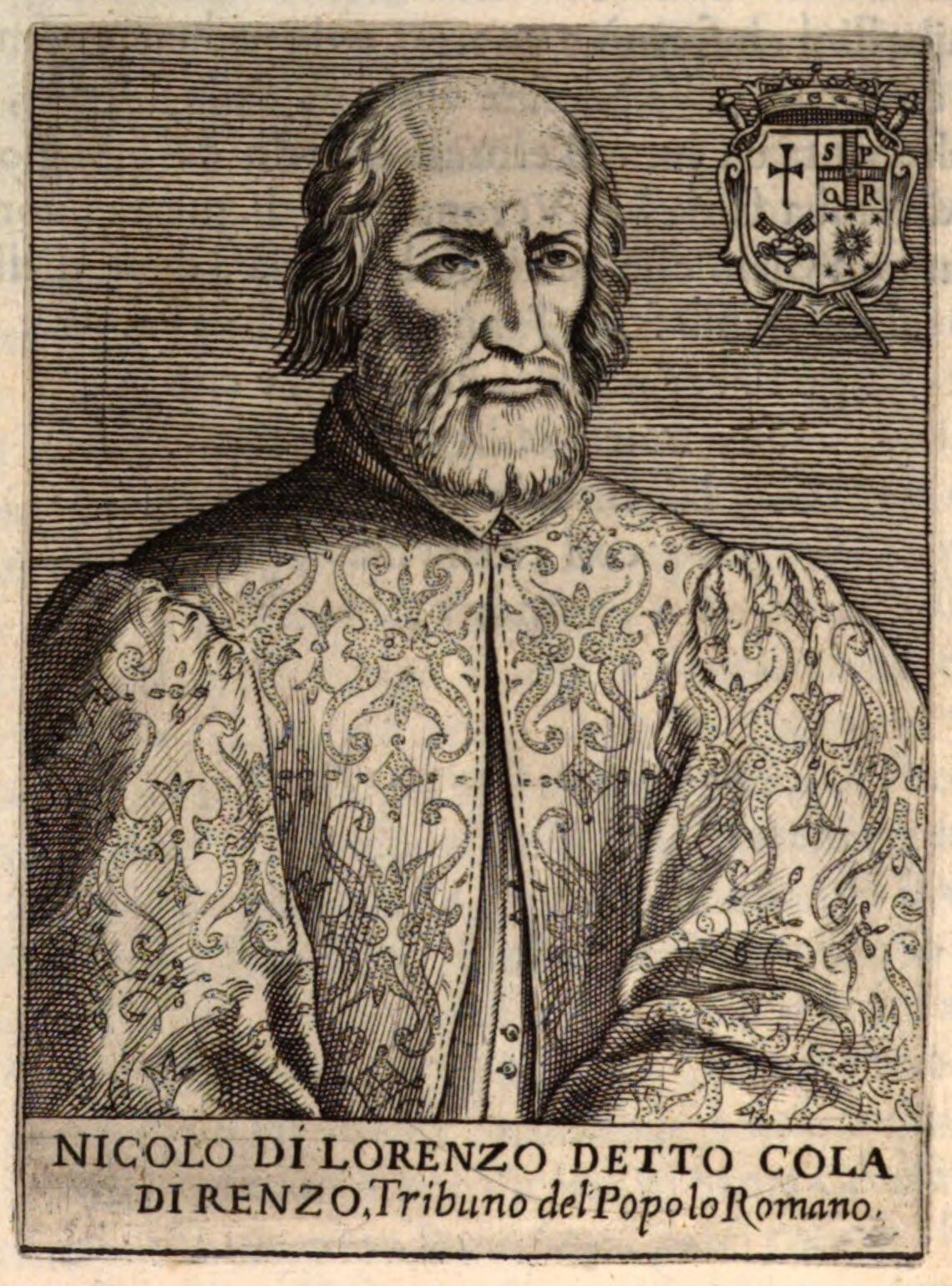
Cola di Rienzo led a revolt in Rome, became the Tribune and later attempted to unify Italy

- Alberto da Giussano is a legendary character of the 12th century who would have participated, as a protagonist, in the battle of Legnano on 29 May 1176. In reality, according to historians, the actual military leader of the Lombard League in the famous military battle with Frederick Barbarossa was Guido da Landriano. Historical analyses made over time have indeed shown that the figure of Alberto da Giussano never existed. In the past, historians, attempting to find a real confirmation, hypothesized the identification of his figure with Albertus de Carathe (Alberto da Carate) and Albertus Longus (Alberto Longo), both among the Milanese who signed the pact in Cremona in March 1167 which established the Lombard League, or in an Alberto da Giussano mentioned in an appeal of 1196 presented to Pope Celestine III on the administration of the church-hospital of San Sempliciano. These, however, are all weak identifications, given that they lack clear and convincing historical confirmation. The battle of Legnano ended the fifth and last descent into Italy of Emperor Frederick Barbarossa, who after the defeat tried to resolve the Italian question by adopting a diplomatic approach. This resulted a few years later in the Peace of Constance (25 June 1183), with which the Emperor recognized the Lombard League and made administrative, political, and judicial concessions to the municipalities, officially ending his attempt to dominate northern Italy. The battle is alluded to in the Canto degli Italiani by Goffredo Mameli and Michele Novaro, the national anthem of Italy since 1946, which reads: «From the Alps to Sicily, Legnano is everywhere» in memory of the victory of Italian populations over foreign ones.
- Cola di Rienzo, led a revolt in Rome, became the Tribune and later attempted to unify Italy. In July 1347, in a decree, he proclaimed the sovereignty of the Roman people over the empire. But before this he had set to work on restoring the authority of Rome over the cities and provinces of Italy, of making the city again caput mundi. He wrote letters to the cities of Italy, asking them to send representatives to an assembly which would meet on 1 August, when the formation of a great federation under the headship of Rome would be considered. On the appointed day, a number of representatives appeared, and Cola issued an edict citing Louis IV, Holy Roman Emperor and his rival Charles IV, Holy Roman Emperor, and also the imperial electors and all others concerned in the dispute, to appear before him in order that he might pronounce judgment. The following day, the festival of the unity of Italy was celebrated, but neither this nor the previous meeting had any practical result. Cola's power, however, was recognized in the Kingdom of Naples, and both Joan I of Naples and Louis I of Hungary appealed to him for protection and aid, and on 15 August with great pomp he was crowned Tribune. Ferdinand Gregorovius says this ceremony "was the fantastic caricature in which ended the imperium of Charles the Great. A world where political action was represented in such guise was ripe for overthrow, or could only be saved by a great mental reformation."

==== Modern ====
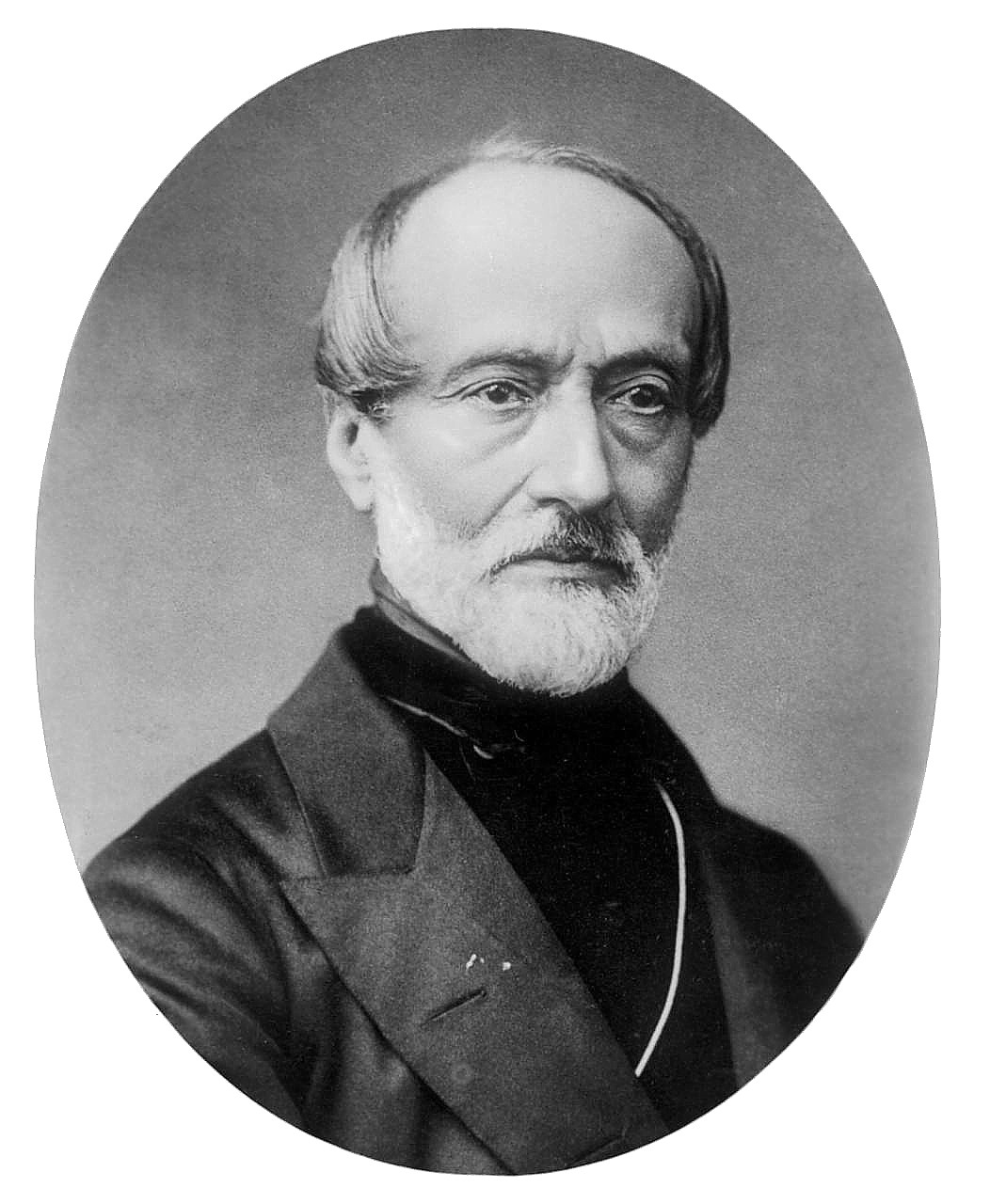
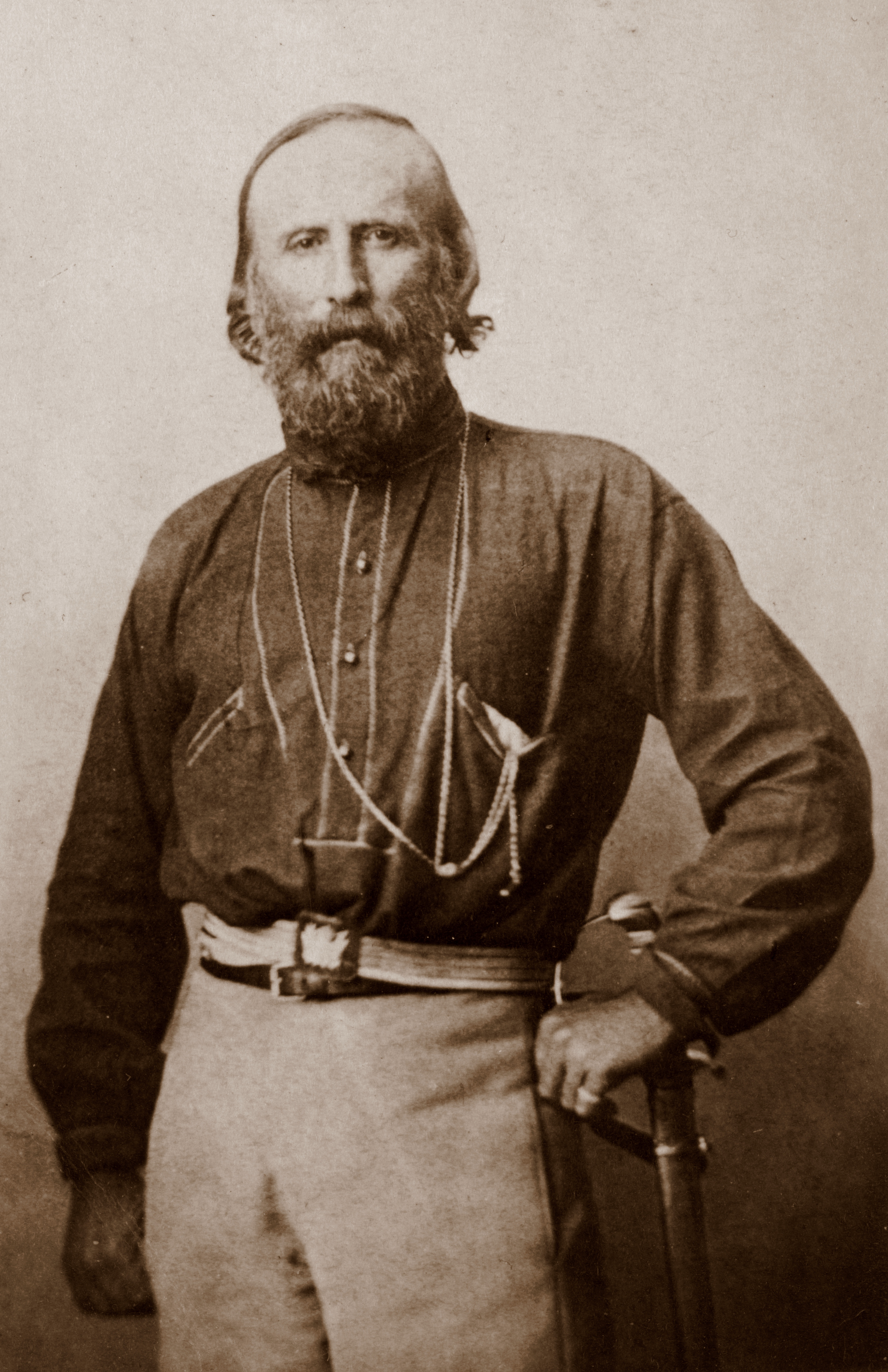
Giuseppe Mazzini (left), highly influential leader of the Italian revolutionary movement; and Giuseppe Garibaldi (right), celebrated as one of the greatest generals of modern times and as the "Hero of the Two Worlds" because of his military enterprises in South America and Europe, fought in many military campaigns that led to Italian unification
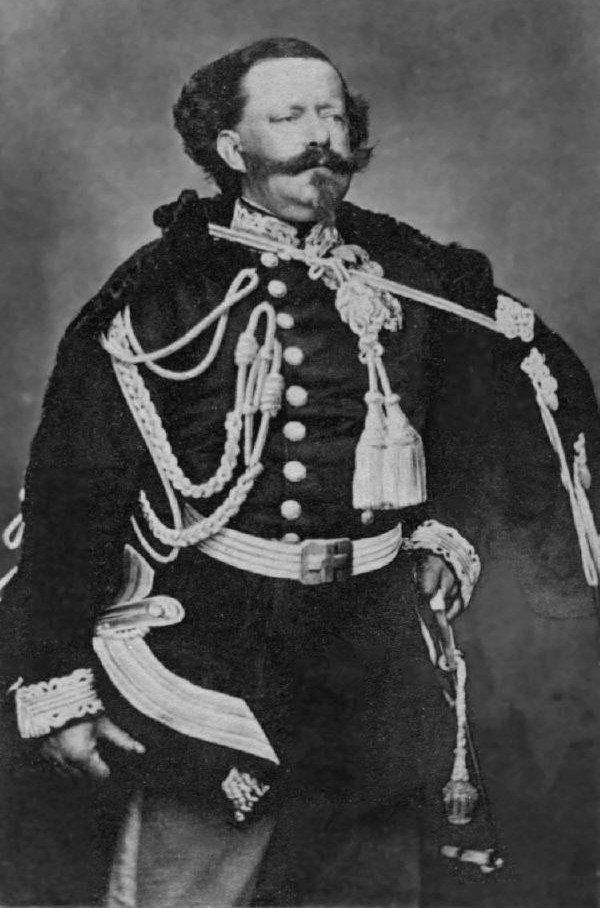
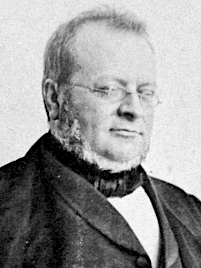
Victor Emmanuel II (left) and Camillo Benso, Count of Cavour (right), leading figures in unification, became respectively the first King and Prime Minister of unified Italy.

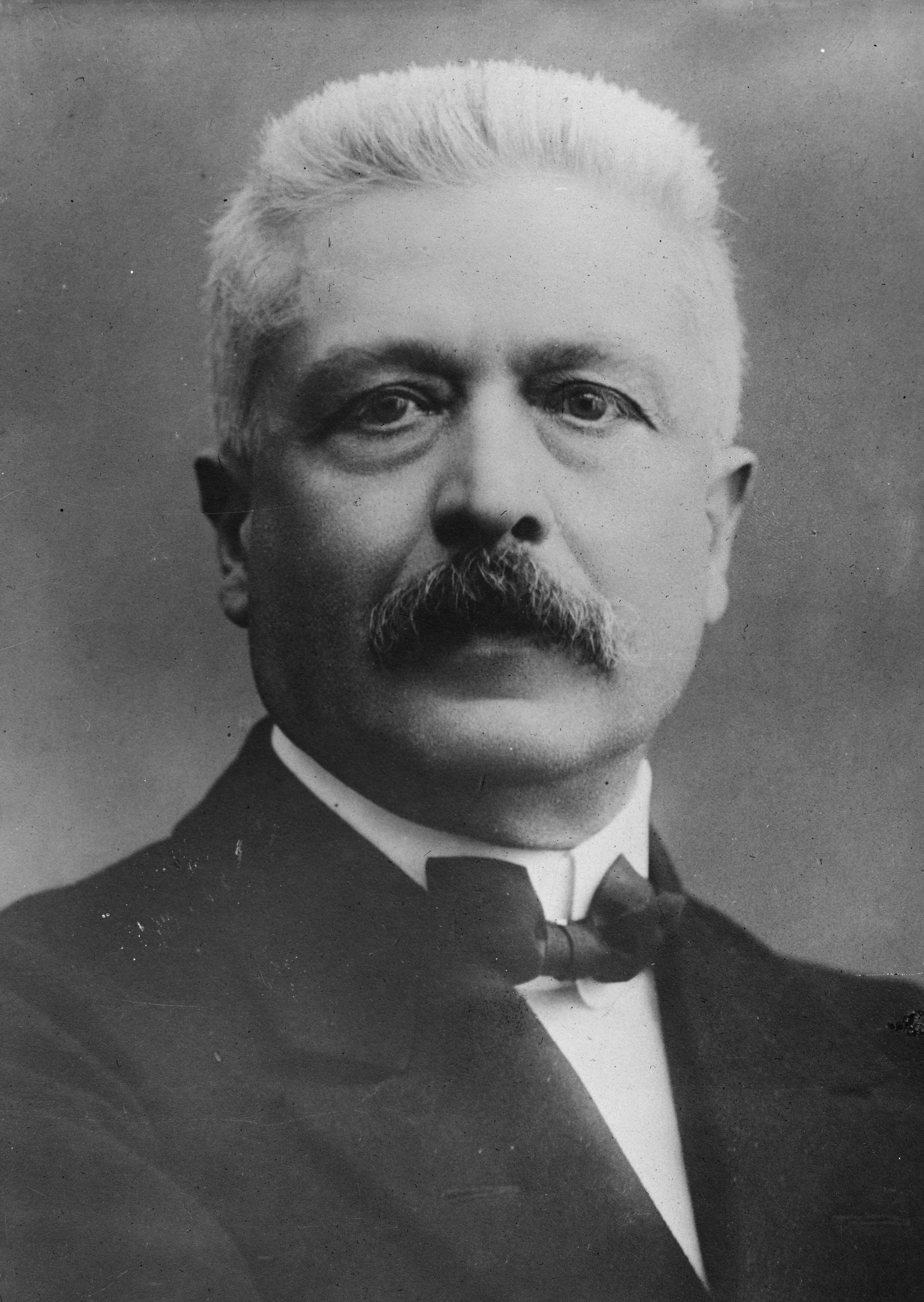
Vittorio Emanuele Orlando, the "Premier of Victory" for defeating the Central Powers along with the Entente in World War I

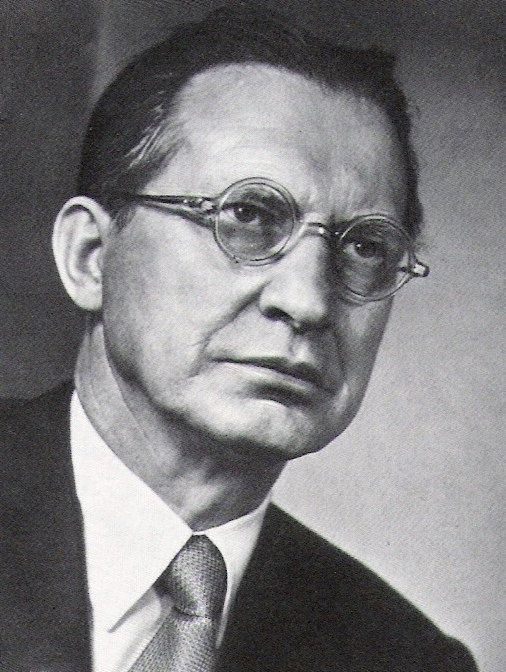
Alcide De Gasperi, first republican Prime Minister of Italy and one of the Founding fathers of the European Union

- Napoleon Bonaparte was the first to use the title of President of the Italian Republic. Born on the island of Corsica to a family of Italian origin, Napoleon Bonaparte was a French military officer and statesman who rose to prominence during the French Revolution and led a series of successful campaigns across Europe during the French Revolutionary and Napoleonic Wars from 1796 to 1815. He was the leader of the French Republic as First Consul from 1799 to 1804, then of the French Empire as Emperor of the French from 1804 to 1814, and briefly again in 1815. The Napoleonic Italian Republic was a short-lived (1802–1805) republic located in Northern Italy. Its capital was Milan and it consisted of the same areas that had comprised the Cisalpine Republic, primarily Lombardy and Romagna. In 1805, following Bonaparte's assumption of the title of Emperor of the French, the Italian Republic was transformed into the Kingdom of Italy (Regno d'Italia), with Napoleon as king and his stepson Eugène de Beauharnais as viceroy. The modern presidential standard of Italy standard recalls the colors of the flag of Italy, with particular reference to the standard of the historic Napoleonic Italian Republic.
- King Victor Emmanuel II, Giuseppe Garibaldi, Prime Minister Camillo Benso, Count of Cavour, and Giuseppe Mazzini have been referred to as the "Four Fathers of the Fatherland" for their contribution to Italian unification. Italy was unified in 1861 and Rome became its capital in 1870.
  - Victor Emmanuel II was King of Sardinia (also known as Piedmont-Sardinia) from 23 March 1849 until 17 March 1861, when he assumed the title of King of Italy and became the first king of an independent, united Italy since the 6th century, a title he held until his death in 1878. Borrowing from the old Latin title Pater Patriae of the Roman emperors, the Italians gave him the epithet of Father of the Fatherland (Italian: Padre della Patria). The Italian national Victor Emmanuel II Monument in Rome, containing the Altare della Patria, was built in his honour.
  - Giuseppe Garibaldi was a general, patriot, revolutionary and republican. He contributed to Italian unification (Risorgimento) and the creation of the Kingdom of Italy. Garibaldi is also known as the "Hero of the Two Worlds" because of his military enterprises in South America and Europe. It is celebrated as one of the greatest generals of modern times and fought in many military campaigns that led to Italian unification.
  - Camillo Benso, Count of Cavour was a politician, statesman, businessman, economist, and noble, and a leading figure in the movement towards Italian unification. Cavour put forth several economic reforms in his native region of Piedmont, at that time part of the Kingdom of Sardinia, in his earlier years and founded the political newspaper Il Risorgimento. After being elected to the Chamber of Deputies, he quickly rose in rank through the Piedmontese government, coming to dominate the Chamber of Deputies through a union of centre-left and centre-right politicians. After a large rail system expansion program, Cavour became prime minister in 1852. As prime minister, Cavour successfully negotiated Piedmont's way through the Crimean War, the Second Italian War of Independence, and Garibaldi's Expedition of the Thousand, managing to manoeuvre Piedmont diplomatically to become a new great power in Europe, controlling a nearly united Italy that was five times as large as Piedmont had been before he came to power.
  - Giuseppe Mazzini was a politician, journalist, and activist for the unification of Italy (Risorgimento) and spearhead of the Italian revolutionary movement. His efforts helped bring about the independent and unified Italy in place of the several separate states, many dominated by foreign powers, that existed until the 19th century. An Italian nationalist in the historical radical tradition and a proponent of a republicanism of social-democratic inspiration, Mazzini helped define the modern European movement for popular democracy in a republican state. Mazzini's thoughts had a very considerable influence on the Italian and European republican movements, in the Constitution of Italy, about Europeanism and more nuanced on many politicians of a later period, among them American president Woodrow Wilson, British prime minister David Lloyd George, Mahatma Gandhi, Indian prime minister Jawaharlal Nehru, Indian independence activist Vinayak Damodar Savarkar, and Israeli prime minister Golda Meir.
- Vittorio Emanuele Orlando was an statesman, who served as the prime minister of Italy from October 1917 to June 1919. Orlando is best known for representing Italy in the 1919 Paris Peace Conference with his foreign minister Sidney Sonnino. He was also known as "Premier of Victory" for defeating the Central Powers along with the Entente in World War I. Italy entered into World War I in 1915 with the aim of completing national unity: for this reason, it is also considered the Fourth Italian War of Independence, in a historiographical perspective that identifies in the latter the conclusion of the unification of Italy, whose military actions began during the revolutions of 1848 with the First Italian War of Independence. He was also the provisional president of the Chamber of Deputies between 1943 and 1945, and a member of the Constituent Assembly that changed the Italian form of government into a republic. Aside from his prominent political role, Orlando was a professor of law and is known for his writings on legal and judicial issues, which number over a hundred works.
- The anti-fascist members of the Constituent Assembly of Italy are considered the "fathers" of the modern Italian Republic, which replaced the Monarchy after a referendum in 1946. The assembly was formed by the representatives of all the forces that contributed to the defeat of Nazi and Fascist forces during the liberation of Italy. After WWII the Italian society was divided, and the economy all but destroyed—per capita income in 1944 was at its lowest point since 1900. The aftermath left Italy angry with the monarchy for its endorsement of the Fascist regime, contributing to a revival of Italian republicanism. Prominent members among them included the Christian democratic Alcide De Gasperi (also counted among the founding fathers of the European Union), the communist Palmiro Togliatti, the social democratic Giuseppe Saragat, the liberal Enrico De Nicola (he later became the first president of Italy), the republican Cipriano Facchinetti and the liberal Vittorio Emanuele Orlando (the "premier of victory" in WWI).. De Gasperi was the last prime minister of the Kingdom of Italy, serving under both Victor Emmanuel III and Umberto II. He was also the first prime minister of the Italian Republic, and also briefly served as provisional head of state after the Italian people voted to end the monarchy and establish a republic.

=== Kosovo ===
It is likely that the Kosovo Albanians regard Ibrahim Rugova as a key figure, since he was the one that brought an independence movement of Kosovo from the fall of Yugoslavia. Additionally, Rugova ruled Kosovo from the 1992 till 2006 as president of the nation, and ever since has been regarded as the National Hero of Kosovo, and led to further independence in 2008 from Serbia to which now 97 nations have recognised Kosovo as of September 2021.

=== Latvia ===
Most Latvians regard Kārlis Ulmanis, a key figure in the Latvian war of independence and four-times Prime Minister of Latvia, as being the founding father of modern Latvia.

=== Liechtenstein ===
- Karl I became the first Prince of Liechtenstein in 1608.
- Hans-Adam I purchased the domain of Schellenberg and the county of Vaduz which would eventually form the modern day Lichtenstein.
- Johann I drafted the first constitution of Lichtenstein, in 1818.

=== Lithuania ===
The first and the only king (1251–1263) of Lithuania, Mindaugas, is seen as the founder of the Lithuanian state, as is commemorated on Statehood Day on 6 July. Dr. Jonas Basanavičius, activist and proponent of the Lithuanian National Revival in the turn of the 19th century into the 20th, who participated in every major event leading to the independence of Lithuania, member of the Council of Lithuania which on 16 February 1918 declared Lithuania an independent state, is universally considered the "Patriarch of the Nation".

=== Luxembourg ===
Sigfried, Count of the Ardennes

=== Malta ===
- Dom Mintoff, often given the epithet of Il-Perit (the Architect), prime minister of Malta twice from 1955 to 1958 and 1971 to 1984, leader of the Malta Labour Party from 1949 to 1984
- Eddie Fenech Adami, prime minister of Malta twice from 1987 to 1996 and from 1998 to 2004; the "founder of European Malta", as he helped Malta join the European Union

=== Moldova ===
- Bogdan I of Moldavia
- Stephen the Great
- Alexandru Lăpușneanu

=== Monaco ===
- François Grimaldi became the first Lord of Monaco when he captured the Rock of Monaco in 1297.
- Honoré II, Prince of Monaco secured recognition of independent sovereignty from Spain in 1633, and then from France by signing the Treaty of Péronne in 1641.

=== Montenegro ===
Petar I Petrović-Njegoš (1747–1830) acquired de facto independence for Montenegro from the Ottoman Empire and created the first Montenegrin law in the modern era.

=== Netherlands ===
Prince William I of Orange (1533–1584) or William the Silent, is known as the father of the Netherlands. He led the Dutch in their Revolt against Spain for their independence. Today he is often called Vader des Vaderlands ("Father of the Fatherland").

=== North Macedonia ===
Kiro Gligorov (first president of independent Macedonia).

=== Norway ===
- King Harald Fairhair, who unified Norway and ruled c. 872–930, is often considered the founder of the nation.
- Usually the Norwegian Constituent Assembly at Eidsvoll in 1814, consisting of 112 men from most of the country, in Norway often referred to as Eidsvoll Men or the Fathers of the Constitution.

=== Papal States/Vatican City/Holy See ===
Peter the Apostle is considered as the first pope.

Papal States took on its modern form as Vatican City under the Lateran Treaty signed by Pope Pius XI, with it serving as territory of the Holy See, the central government of both the country and Catholic Church.

=== Poland ===
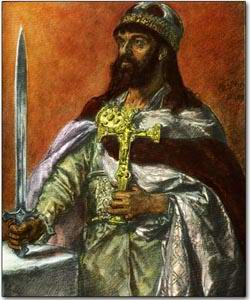
Mieszko I of Poland

Legendary:

- Lech, legendary first leader of Polans tribe.

Kingdom of Poland and Rzeczpospolita Obojga Narodów:

- Mieszko I (c. 920/45–992), the first historical ruler of Poland, Mieszko I is considered the de facto creator of the Polish state. He was a Duke of the Polans from about 960 until his death. Mieszko I's marriage in 965 to the Přemyslid princess Dobrawa and his baptism in 966 put him and his country in the cultural sphere of Western Christianity. According to existing sources, Mieszko I was a wise politician, a talented military leader and charismatic ruler. He successfully used diplomacy, concluding an alliance with Bohemia first, and then with Sweden and the Holy Roman Empire. In foreign policy, he placed the interests of his country foremost, even entering into agreements with former enemies. On his death, he left to his sons a country of greatly expanded territory, with a well-established position in Europe. Mieszko I also appeared as "Dagome" in a papal document from about 1085, called "Dagome iudex", which mentions a gift or dedication of Mieszko's land to the Pope (the act took place almost a hundred years earlier).
- Bolesław I Chrobry (967–1025), was Duke of Poland from 992 to 1025, and the first King of Poland in 1025. He was the son of Mieszko I of Poland by his wife, Dobrawa of Bohemia. He supported the missionary views of Adalbert, Bishop of Prague, and Bruno of Querfurt. The martyrdom of Adalbert in 997 and his imminent canonization were used to consolidate Poland's autonomy from the Holy Roman Empire. This perhaps happened most clearly during the Congress of Gniezno (11 March 1000), which resulted in the establishment of a Polish church structure with a Metropolitan See at Gniezno. This See was independent of the German Archbishopric of Magdeburg, which had tried to claim jurisdiction over the Polish church. Following the Congress of Gniezno, bishoprics were also established in Kraków, Wrocław and Kołobrzeg, and Bolesław formally repudiated paying tribute to the Holy Roman Empire. In the summer of 1018, in one of his expeditions, Bolesław I captured Kiev, where he installed his son-in-law Sviatopolk I as ruler. According to legend, Bolesław chipped his sword when striking Kiev's Golden Gate. Later, in honor of this legend, a sword called Szczerbiec ("Jagged Sword") would become the coronation sword of Poland's kings. Bolesław I was a remarkable politician, strategist, and statesman. He not only turned Poland into a country comparable to older western monarchies, but he raised it to the front rank of European states. Bolesław conducted successful military campaigns in the west, south and east. He consolidated Polish lands and conquered territories outside the borders of modern-day Poland, including Slovakia, Moravia, Red Ruthenia, Meissen, Lusatia, and Bohemia. He was a powerful mediator in Central European affairs. Finally, as the culmination of his reign, in 1025 he had himself crowned King of Poland. He was the first Polish ruler to receive the title of rex (Latin: "king").

Kingdom of Poland and Grand Duchy of Lithuania under Władysław II Jagiełło rule.

- Władysław II Jagiełło (c. 1352/1362 – 1434) was the Grand Duke of Lithuania (1377–1434) and then the King of Poland (1386–1434), first alongside his wife Jadwiga until 1399, and then sole King of Poland. He ruled in Lithuania from 1377. Born a pagan, in 1386 he converted to Catholicism and was baptized as Władysław in Kraków, married the young Queen Jadwiga, and was crowned King of Poland as Władysław II Jagiełło. In 1387 he converted Lithuania to Christianity. His own reign in Poland started in 1399, upon the death of Queen Jadwiga, and lasted a further thirty-five years and laid the foundation for the centuries-long Polish–Lithuanian union. The dynasty ruled both states until 1572, and became one of the most influential dynasties in late medieval and early modern Central and Eastern Europe. During his reign, the Polish-Lithuanian state was the largest state in the Christian world. The reign of Władysław II Jagiełło extended Polish frontiers and is often considered the beginning of Poland's Golden Age.
- Zygmunt II August (1520–1572), was the King of Poland and Grand Duke of Lithuania, the only son of Sigismund I the Old, whom Sigismund II succeeded in 1548. In 1569 he oversaw the signing of the Union of Lublin between Poland and the Grand Duchy of Lithuania, which formed the Polish–Lithuanian Commonwealth and introduced an elective monarchy.
- Tadeusz Kościuszko (1746–1817) was a Polish-Lithuanian military engineer, statesman, and military leader who became a national hero in Poland, Lithuania, Belarus, and the United States. He fought in the Polish–Lithuanian Commonwealth's struggles against Russia and Prussia, and on the U.S. side in the American Revolutionary War. As Supreme Commander of the Polish National Armed Forces, he led the 1794 Kościuszko Uprising.

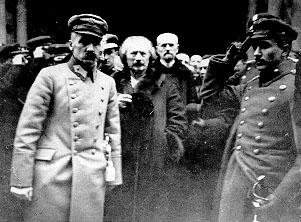
Gen. Józef Piłsudski (first on the left) Ignacy Jan Paderewski (next to Piłsudski in the a civil coat) and Stanisław Wojciechowski (behind Paderewski), future second President of Poland, during the opening ceremony of the Legislative Sejm, 9 February 1919.

Fathers of Polish Independence:

- Józef Piłsudski (1867–1935), was a Polish statesman who served as the Chief of State (1918–22) and First Marshal of Poland (from 1920). From World War I he had great power in Polish politics and was a distinguished figure on the international scene. He is viewed as a father of the Druga Rzeczpospolita Polska re-established in 1918, 123 years after the 1795 Partitions of Poland by Austria, Prussia and Russia.
- Roman Dmowski (1864–1939), was a Polish politician, statesman, polyglot, and the leader of National Democracy movement. He was represented Poland at the Paris Peace Conference in 1919.
- Ignacy Jan Paderewski (1860–1941), was a Polish pianist and composer, freemason, politician, statesman and spokesman for Polish independence. He was a favorite of concert audiences around the world. His musical fame opened access to diplomacy and the media. Paderewski played an important role in meeting with President Woodrow Wilson and obtaining the explicit inclusion of independent Poland as point 13 in Wilson's peace terms in 1918, called the Fourteen Points. He was the Prime Minister of Poland and also Poland's foreign minister in 1919, and represented Poland at the Paris Peace Conference in 1919.
- Wojciech Korfanty (1873–1939), was a Polish activist, journalist and politician, who served as a member of the German parliaments, the Reichstag and the Prussian Landtag, and later, in the Polish Sejm. Briefly, he also was a paramilitary leader, known for organizing the Polish Silesian Uprisings in Upper Silesia, which after World War I was contested by Germany and Poland. Korfanty fought to protect Poles from discrimination and the policies of Germanisation in Upper Silesia before the war and sought to join Silesia to Poland after Poland regained its independence.
- Wincenty Witos (1874–1945), was a Polish politic and the leader of the Polish Peasants' Movement. Witos was also a leader of Polish Liquidation Committee, formed in Kraków in 1918.
- Ignacy Daszyński (1866–1936), was a Polish socialist politician, journalist, and Prime Minister of the Provisional People's Government of the Republic of Poland, formed in Lublin in 1918.
- Józef Haller von Hallenburg (1873–1960) was a lieutenant general of the Polish Army, a legionary in the Polish Legions, harcmistrz (the highest Scouting instructor rank in Poland), the president of the Polish Scouting and Guiding Association (ZHP), and a political and social activist. After the Peace of Brest-Litovsk he arrived in France in July 1918, where on behalf of the Polish National Committee he created what was known as the Blue Army (from the color of its French uniforms, also known as Haller's Army). For the next few months his army, allied to the Entente, would fight against Germany.

=== Portugal ===
Portugal is unusual among European states in having a continuous independence, with two interruptions, from the twelfth century. Its founders are therefore the first count of Portucale, the first acknowledged king, the defender of that kingship against Castile in 1385, and the restorer of sovereignty after the Iberian Union. Disney, A. R. (2009). A History of Portugal and the Portuguese Empire. Vol. 1. Cambridge University Press.

Viriathus (d. 139 BC) led Lusitanian resistance to Rome in western Iberia for about eight years and forced a treaty before he was assassinated. "Viriathus". Encyclopædia Britannica. He founded no Portuguese state, which did not exist. From the Renaissance onward, and especially in nineteenth-century nationalism, he was recast as a precursor of Portuguese independence and a symbol of resistance on the Atlantic edge of Hispania. Anderson, James M. (2000). The History of Portugal. Greenwood.

Vímara Peres (d. 873) was granted the county of Portucale by Alfonso III of Asturias in 868, after the reconquest of the Douro region around the old Roman settlement of Portus Cale. The name of the later kingdom derives from that county. Vímara founded a marcher lordship inside the Asturian-Leonese realm, not a sovereign Portugal. Mattoso, José (1993). História de Portugal. Vol. 1. Círculo de Leitores.

Henry, Count of Portugal (c. 1066–1112), a Burgundian knight in Leonese service, received the County of Portugal as a fief of León and based it at Braga. The grant was meant to push the frontier south, not to create a kingdom. His widow Teresa styled herself queen; their son took the county out of Leonese control. "Henry". Encyclopædia Britannica.

Afonso I of Portugal (Afonso Henriques, c. 1109–1185) is the founder of the Portuguese kingdom. On 24 June 1128 he defeated his mother Teresa at the Battle of São Mamede and became sole ruler of the county. After the victory at Ourique (25 July 1139), traditionally against the Almoravids, his men acclaimed him king. "Afonso I". Encyclopædia Britannica. Alfonso VII of León recognized the title in the Treaty of Zamora (1143). Afonso took Lisbon in 1147 with northern crusaders and, in 1179, obtained from Pope Alexander III the bull Manifestis Probatum, which confirmed him and his heirs as kings of an independent Portugal. He moved the political centre toward Coimbra and fixed a realm distinct from León-Castile, from the Minho toward the Tagus. Livermore, H. V. (1947). A History of Portugal. Cambridge University Press. Later Portuguese chronology treats 1139 as the birth of the state and Afonso as o Fundador.

John I of Portugal.

John I of Portugal (1357–1433), illegitimate son of Peter I and master of the Order of Aviz, was elected king by the Cortes of Coimbra in 1385 during the succession crisis that followed Ferdinand I's death. Victory over Castile at Aljubarrota (14 August 1385), with Nuno Álvares Pereira as constable, preserved independence. "John I". Encyclopædia Britannica. The House of Aviz replaced Burgundy; the Treaty of Windsor (1386) bound Portugal to England. John's capture of Ceuta in 1415 opened the overseas expansion continued by his son Henry the Navigator. John I did not found Portugal, but he refounded it as a dynasty able to survive Castile and to become a maritime power. Newitt, Malyn (2005). A History of Portuguese Overseas Expansion, 1400–1668. Routledge.

John IV of Portugal (1604–1656), 8th Duke of Braganza, was acclaimed king on 1 December 1640 after a palace coup ended sixty years of Habsburg rule under the Iberian Union. The Restoration War lasted until the Treaty of Lisbon (1668), by which Spain recognized Portuguese sovereignty. "John IV". Encyclopædia Britannica. John IV is o Restaurador: founder of the House of Braganza on the throne and of Portugal's second independence, the political fact on which the later monarchy, the republic of 1910 and the democratic state after 1976 all rest. Disney, A. R. (2009). A History of Portugal and the Portuguese Empire. Vol. 1. Cambridge University Press.

=== Romania ===
- Burebista is considered the great king who unified all the Dacian tribes. He is also known for creating a powerful empire that stretched from west to the Adriatic Sea and Southern Germany, from east to the Black Sea, from north to Southern Poland and from south to Greek Macedonia and Eastern Thrace. He is considered by many Romanians as a national hero. The Dacian Kingdom under Burebista was the greatest territorial extent in Romania's history.
- Decebalus and Trajan are considered to be the fathers of the Romanian people, as Roman veterans were settled on the present-day territory of Romania following Trajan's Dacian Wars.
- Basarab I the Founder (c. 1270-1351/1352) was the great voivode of Wallachia. Basarab either came into power between 1304 and 1324 by dethroning or peacefully succeeding the legendary founder of Wallachia, Radu Negru, or in 1310 by succeeding his father, Thocomerius. In 1330 he defeated Charles I of Hungary at the battle of Posada, and the first independent Romanian state was consequently founded. He founded the Basarab dynasty and his descendants ruled Wallachia for more than three centuries. From the middle of the 14th century, some foreign chronicles used derivations of his name: "Basarab", when referring to Wallachia.
- Michael the Brave (1558–1601) was the Prince of Wallachia (1593–1601), Prince of Moldavia (1600) and de facto ruler of Transylvania (1599–1600). He is considered one of Romania's greatest national heroes. Since the 19th century, Michael the Brave has been regarded as a symbol of the unity of all Romanians, as his reign marked the first time all states mainly inhabited by Romanians were under the same ruler.
- Alexandru Ioan Cuza was elected as the first leader of the modern Romanian state. He presided over Wallachia and Moldavia in a personal union, which later became permanent even though he was forced to abdicate.
- Carol I was the first King of Romania that obtained the independence of the country.
- Ion C. Brătianu established the foundation of the modern Romanian State.
- Mihail Kogălniceanu established the foundation of the modern Romanian State.
- Ferdinand I was King of Romania when the country gained Transylvania and Bessarabia.

=== Russia ===
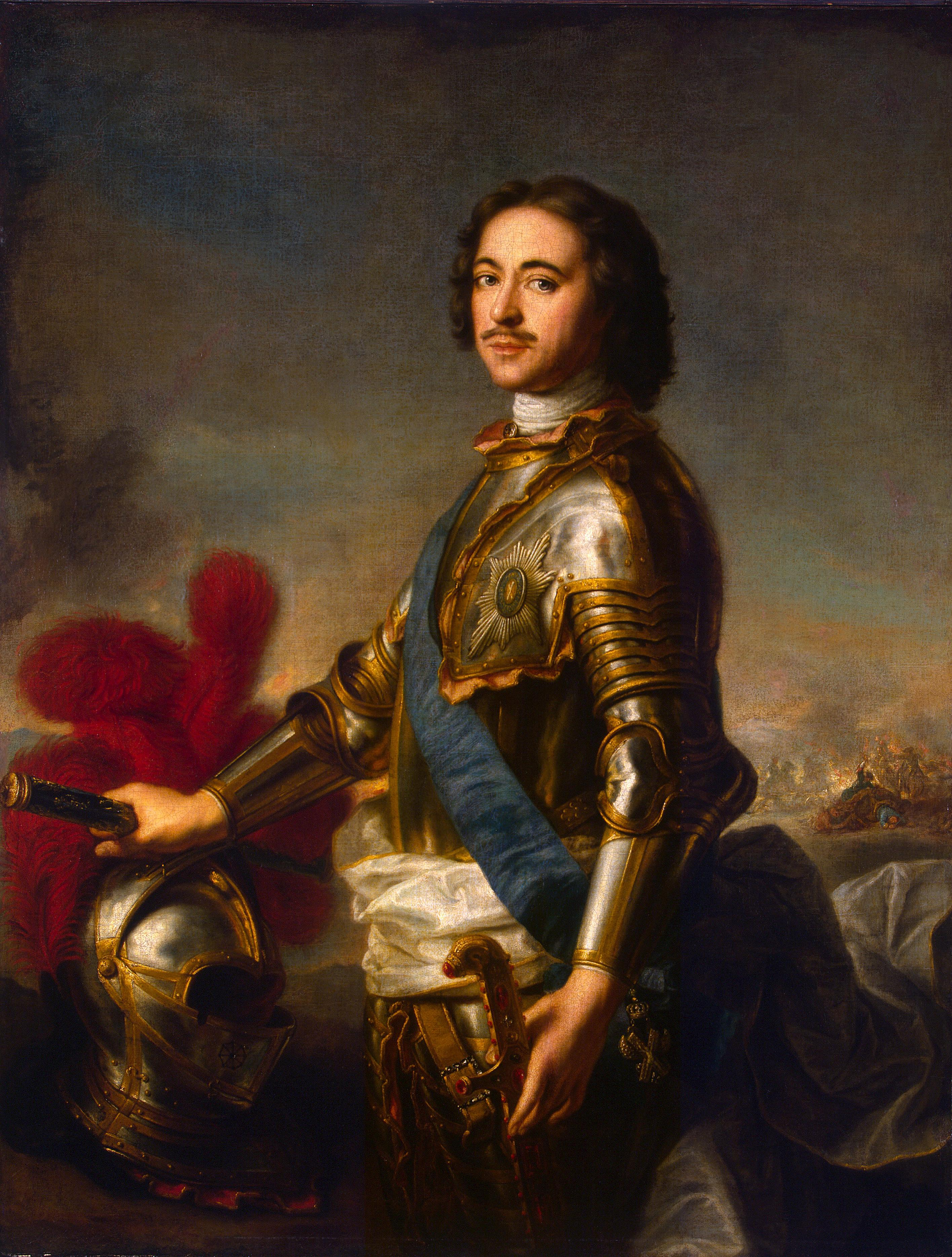
Peter The Great

Russian statehood is conventionally described as a succession of polities rather than as a single act of foundation: Kievan Rus', the Grand Duchy of Moscow, the Tsardom of Russia, the Russian Empire, the Russian Soviet Federative Socialist Republic and the Soviet Union, and the post-1991 Russian Federation. Traditional chronology dates the first ruling house from the calling of the Varangians in 862, while modern institutional history emphasizes the Muscovite "gathering of the lands," the imperial reforms of the eighteenth century, 1917 and 1991. Riasanovsky, Nicholas V. (2011). A History of Russia (8th ed.). Oxford University Press.Pipes, Richard (1995). Russia under the Old Regime. Penguin.

Rurik (d. c. 879) is the semi-legendary Varangian prince whom the Primary Chronicle presents as invited to rule Novgorod in 862 in order to end internecine strife. His dynasty, the Rurikids, supplied the princes of Novgorod, Kiev and later Moscow until 1598. Cross, Samuel Hazzard; Sherbowitz-Wetzor, Olgerd P., eds. (1953). The Russian Primary Chronicle: Laurentian Text. Medieval Academy of America. The account is a later dynastic construction rather than a contemporary record, and the polity that emerged under Rurik's successors was an East Slavic-Scandinavian confederation centred first on Novgorod and then on Kiev, not the later Muscovite or imperial state. Franklin, Simon; Shepard, Jonathan (1996). The Emergence of Rus, 750–1200. Longman. Rurik remains, however, the traditional point of origin of Russian monarchy, commemorated in the nineteenth-century Millennium of Russia monument at Novgorod.

Vladimir I ("the Great," c. 958–1015), grand prince of Kiev, consolidated Novgorod and Kiev into a single Rus' realm and, around 988–989, accepted baptism in the Byzantine rite and imposed Christianity on his subjects. "Vladimir I". Encyclopædia Britannica. The so-called Baptism of Rus' attached the East Slavic elite to Constantinopolitan liturgy, law, literacy and political theology, and later Muscovite writers treated Vladimir as a founding Christian sovereign. The same conversion is foundational in Ukrainian and Belarusian historical memory; it created a shared religious civilization rather than a modern national state. Poppe, Andrzej (1982). The Rise of Christian Russia. Variorum.

Ivan III ("the Great," 1440–1505), grand prince of Moscow from 1462, is the principal architect of a centralized East Slavic monarchy after the Mongol period. He annexed Novgorod (1478) and Tver (1485), reduced other princes to service, issued the Sudebnik of 1497, rebuilt the Moscow Kremlin and adopted Byzantine court ceremonial after his marriage to Sophia Palaiologina. "Ivan III". Encyclopædia Britannica. The bloodless Great Stand on the Ugra River in 1480 is traditionally taken as the end of formal dependence on the Golden Horde. Ivan styled himself sovereign of "all Rus'" and occasionally used the title tsar. Later historiography therefore credits him, more than Rurik or Ivan IV, with founding the Muscovite state from which imperial Russia grew. Fennell, J. L. I. (1961). Ivan the Great of Moscow. Macmillan.Crummey, Robert O. (1987). The Formation of Muscovy, 1304–1613. Longman.

Ivan IV ("the Terrible," 1530–1584) was crowned the first tsar of Russia in 1547, converting the grand princely title into a claim of autocratic, quasi-imperial sovereignty. "Ivan the Terrible". Encyclopædia Britannica. Early reforms created a standing streltsy force, a law code (1550) and the first Zemsky Sobor. The conquests of Kazan (1552) and Astrakhan (1556) opened the Volga and began Russia's transformation into a multi-ethnic, transcontinental power; Cossack expansion into Siberia followed. The later oprichnina and the Livonian War, however, devastated the elite and the economy and prepared the dynastic crisis of 1598. Ivan IV therefore founded the tsardom as a legal and ideological form, while also illustrating its capacity for personal terror. Madariaga, Isabel de (2005). Ivan the Terrible. Yale University Press.

Michael I (1596–1645) was elected tsar by the Zemsky Sobor in 1613 after the Time of Troubles, foreign intervention and the extinction of the ruling Rurikid line. His elevation founded the House of Romanov, which reigned until 1917. "Michael". Encyclopædia Britannica. The early Romanov settlement restored a native dynasty and a working central government rather than inventing new institutions; real authority was at first shared with the tsar's father, Patriarch Filaret. Michael's importance as a founder is dynastic and restorative: without 1613 there is no imperial Russia of the Romanovs. Dunning, Chester S. L. (2001). Russia's First Civil War: The Time of Troubles and the Founding of the Romanov Dynasty. Penn State University Press.

Peter the Great (1672–1725), tsar from 1682 and emperor from 1721, recast Muscovy as a European great power. Victory over Sweden in the Great Northern War and the Treaty of Nystad gave Russia a Baltic coastline; the new capital of Saint Petersburg, founded in 1703, symbolized the reorientation toward Europe. "Peter I". Encyclopædia Britannica. Peter created a regular army and navy, replaced the prikazy with colleges, established the Governing Senate (1711), abolished the patriarchate in favour of the Most Holy Synod (1721) and introduced the Table of Ranks (1722), which tied noble status to state service. Hughes, Lindsey (1998). Russia in the Age of Peter the Great. Yale University Press. On 22 October (O.S.) 1721 he accepted the title of emperor. The Petrine state, not the Kievan princedom, is the usual starting point for the modern Russian empire. Riasanovsky, Nicholas V. (1985). The Image of Peter the Great in Russian History and Thought. Oxford University Press.

Catherine the Great (1729–1796) completed the imperial structure created by Peter. Territorial annexations in the partitions of Poland and the wars with the Ottoman Empire brought the northern Black Sea coast, Crimea and large West Slavic and Lithuanian populations into the empire, making Russia a fully multi-ethnic European power. "Catherine the Great". Encyclopædia Britannica. The Nakaz of 1767, the provincial reform of 1775 and the Charters to the Nobility and the Towns (1785) reorganized administration and social estates, while the Hermitage and the Academy of Sciences anchored a Europeanized court culture. Catherine did not found a new state, but she fixed the eighteenth-century empire as a durable form of Russian government and expansion. Madariaga, Isabel de (1981). Russia in the Age of Catherine the Great. Yale University Press.

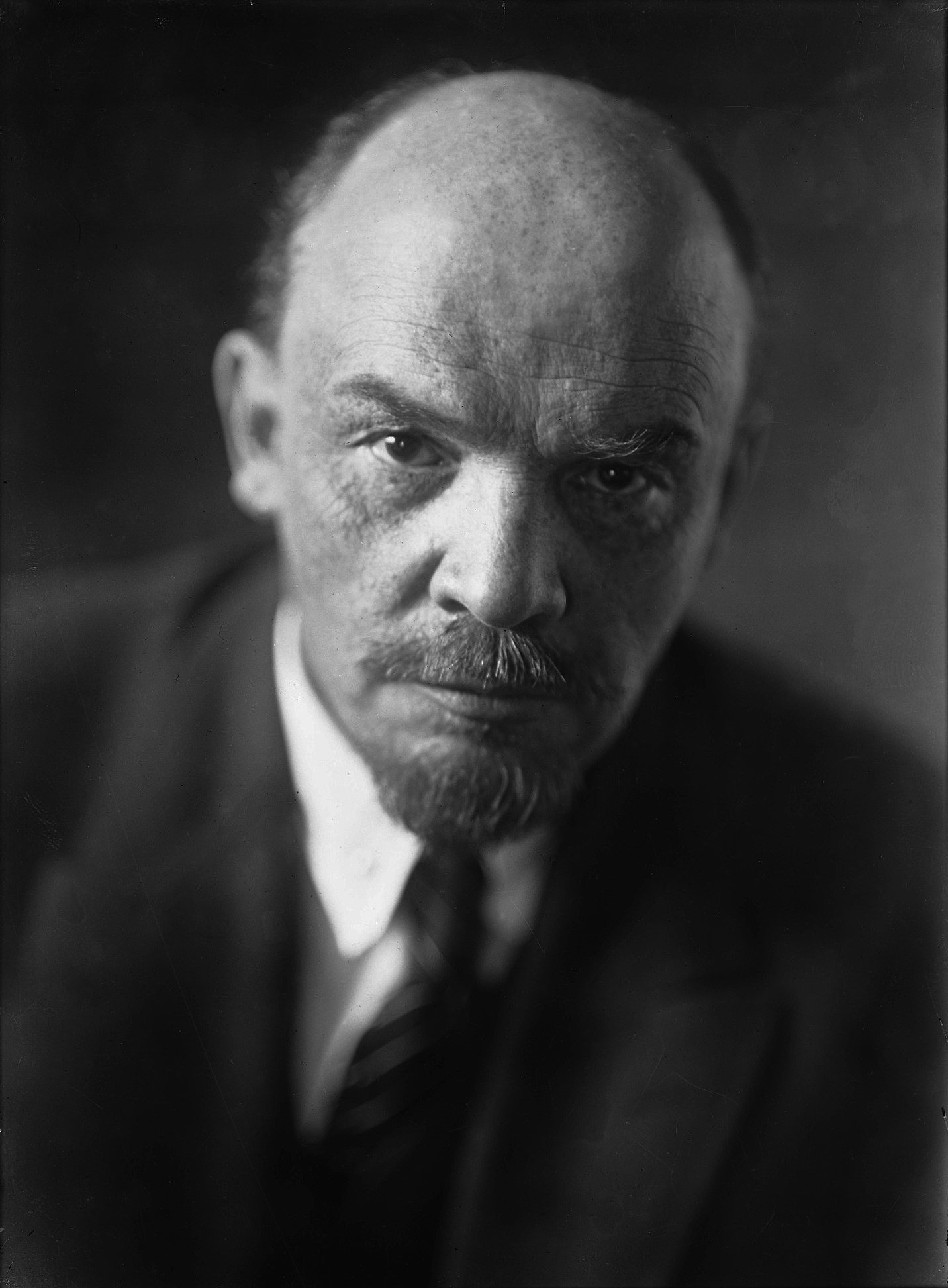
Vladimir Lenin

Vladimir Lenin (1870–1924) led the Bolshevik seizure of power in October 1917, headed the Council of People's Commissars and founded the one-party Soviet state on the territory of the former empire. The RSFSR of 1918, victory in the Civil War, nationalization of land and industry, the Cheka and the Treaty on the Creation of the USSR (30 December 1922) replaced the monarchy with a federal socialist union dominated in practice by the Communist Party and by Soviet Russia. "Vladimir Lenin". Encyclopædia Britannica.Service, Robert (2000). Lenin: A Biography. Macmillan. Lenin is therefore the founder of Soviet Russia and of the Soviet Union, not of the post-1991 federation. His legacy is inseparable from Red Terror, War Communism and the suppression of rival socialist and national movements; later official cults treated him as a secular founding father of the Soviet order. Pipes, Richard (1990). The Russian Revolution. Knopf.

Boris Yeltsin (1931–2007) was elected president of the RSFSR in June 1991 and became the first president of an independent Russian Federation after the failure of the August coup and the Belovezha Accords of 8 December 1991, which, with the Alma-Ata Protocol, dissolved the USSR. "Boris Yeltsin". Encyclopædia Britannica. Russia assumed the Soviet Union's international legal personality. The Constitution adopted by referendum on 12 December 1993, after the violent dissolution of the Supreme Soviet in October, created a presidential republic that remains the basic law of the state. Colton, Timothy J. (2008). Yeltsin: A Life. Basic Books. Yeltsin's founding role is therefore institutional and international: he established the present Russian state, while also concentrating executive power in the presidency and presiding over a collapse of living standards and state capacity in the 1990s. Sakwa, Richard (2008). Russian Politics and Society (4th ed.). Routledge.

=== San Marino ===
Saint Marinus was the founder of the world's oldest surviving republic, San Marino, in 301. Tradition holds that he was a stonemason by trade who came from the island of Rab on the other side of the Adriatic Sea (modern Croatia), fleeing persecution for his Christian beliefs in the Diocletianic Persecution.

=== Serbia ===
- Stefan Nemanja, grand prince of the medieval Serbian Grand Principality that would eventually evolve into the Serbian Kingdom and Serbian Empire. He is the founder of the Nemanjić dynasty.
- Karađorđe, revolutionary who led the struggle for Serbia's liberation and independence from the Ottoman Empire during the First Serbian Uprising. He is the founder of the Karađorđević dynasty and bears the honorific title Father of the Nation.
- Miloš Obrenović, a revolutionary who led the struggle for Serbia's liberation and independence from the Ottoman Empire during the Second Serbian Uprising. He is the founder of the Obrenović dynasty and bears the honorific title Father of the Nation.

=== Slovakia ===
Many Slovaks see Great Moravia as their ancestors, which would make Mojmír I a founder.

- Ľudovít Štúr, Slovak revolutionary, writer, and leader of the Slovak National Revival. He codified the modern Slovak literary language, and championed the idea of an autonomous Slovakia as a participant in the Slovak Revolt during the Hungarian Revolution of 1848.
- Milan Rastislav Štefánik, Slovak diplomat, aviator, astronomer, and general who, along with Tomáš Masaryk and Edvard Beneš, founded Czechoslovakia.

=== Slovenia ===
France Bučar is a Slovenian politician, legal expert and author. Between 1990 and 1992, he served as the first chairman of the freely elected Slovenian Parliament. He was the one to formally declare the independence of Slovenia on 25 June 1991. He is considered one of the founders of Slovenian democracy and independence. He is also considered, together with Peter Jambrek, as the main author of the current Slovenian constitution. Jože Pučnik was president of DEMOS and one of the main persons in the Slovenian fight for independence. The largest Slovenian airport is named Letališče Jožeta Pučnika (Jože Pučnik airport). Lojze Peterle was first prime minister of Slovenia and Milan Kučan was the first president. Janez Janša was the first minister of defense, and played a big role in the development of Slovenian Territorial Defence, together with Janez Slapar who was the first chief of staff. The first Minister of Interior was Igor Bavčar, who helped the Slovenian Territorial Defense defeat the Yugoslav Army with the police.

=== Spain ===
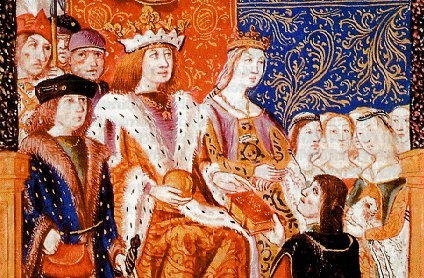
The Catholic Monarchs of Spain

The Catholic Monarchs, Isabella of Castile and Ferdinand II of Aragon, unified Spain in the 15th century. Both came from the noble House of Trastámara. Charles V, Holy Roman Emperor was the first to inherit the dynastic union and the first Habsburg monarch. His successor, Philip II of Spain, established a capital in Madrid. The first Bourbon King of Spain was Philip V of Spain, who is also responsible for the de jure unification of the country.

=== Sweden ===
While Sweden had existed as a monarchy of sorts long before his time, Birger Jarl, father of and regent for Valdemar, King of Sweden, can be said to have established Sweden as a nation. Birger was Jarl in the years 1248–66.

Gustav I of Sweden, who led Sweden out of the Kalmar Union in 1523, is often considered a father of the nation.

=== Switzerland ===
Both the anonymous Eidgenossen who drew up the Federal Charter of 1291, or the liberal statesmen who helped found the modern Swiss Confederation in 1848 can be considered the founders of Switzerland. Among the latter, those who became the first members of the Swiss Federal Council were perhaps the most notable: Ulrich Ochsenbein, Jakob Stämpfli, Jonas Furrer, Josef Munzinger, Henri Druey, Friedrich Frey-Herosé, Wilhelm Matthias Naeff and Stefano Franscini.

=== Ukraine ===
In 1648, Bohdan Khmelnytsky and Petro Doroshenko led the largest of the Cossack uprisings against the Commonwealth and the Polish king.

Mykhailo Hrushevsky was the President the Central Council of Ukraine People's Republic.

Leonid Kravchuk is the First President of Ukraine elected in 1991.

=== United Kingdom ===
The United Kingdom was assembled in stages from older kingdoms. England and Scotland were separate sovereign states until the Acts of Union 1707; Ireland was a distinct kingdom in personal union until the Acts of Union 1800; Wales was incorporated into the English legal order in the thirteenth and sixteenth centuries. There is therefore no single founder of the UK comparable to a revolutionary constituent assembly. The figures below are those most often credited with founding one of the component kingdoms, the parliamentary Union, or the modern system of government. Colley, Linda (2009). Britons: Forging the Nation 1707–1837 (revised ed.). Yale University Press.Davies, Norman (1999). The Isles: A History. Macmillan.

Alfred the Great (849–899), King of Wessex from 871, halted the Danish conquest of southern England after the victory at Edington (878) and the settlement recorded in the Treaty of Alfred and Guthrum. He fortified the burghal system, issued a law code that drew on earlier West Saxon, Mercian and Kentish custom, and promoted vernacular learning. "Alfred". Encyclopædia Britannica. He never ruled the whole island and did not use a stable title "king of England," but by styling himself king of the Anglo-Saxons and by creating a viable West Saxon-Mercian polity he made a unified English kingdom possible. Later English and British tradition treats him as the first national king. Abels, Richard (1998). Alfred the Great: War, Kingship and Culture in Anglo-Saxon England. Longman.

Æthelstan (c. 894–939), Alfred's grandson, is the first ruler widely accepted as King of the English. In 927 he took York and received the submission of other northern and western rulers; the victory at Brunanburh (937) defended that hegemony. "Athelstan". Encyclopædia Britannica. His charters and law codes treat England as a single realm. If Alfred founded the possibility of England, Æthelstan first governed it as one kingdom. Foot, Sarah (2011). Æthelstan: The First King of England. Yale University Press.

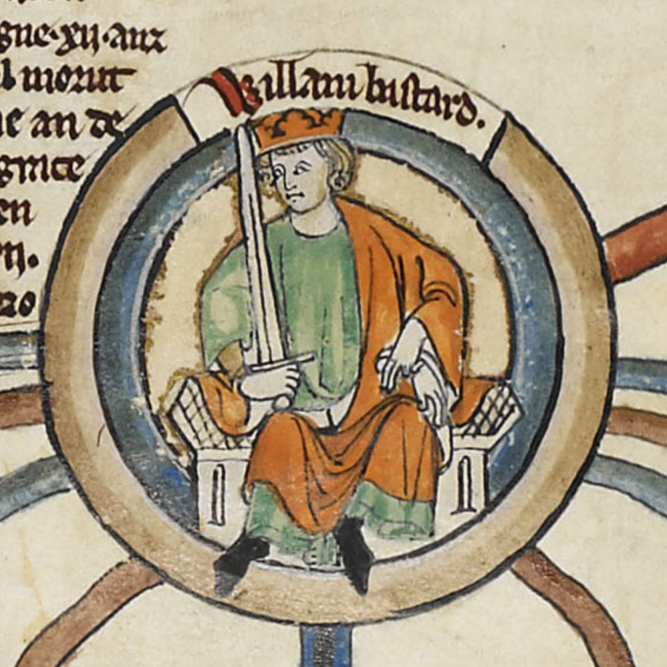
William the Conqueror.

William the Conqueror (c. 1028–1087) seized the English crown at Hastings in 1066 and replaced the Anglo-Saxon elite with a Norman aristocracy holding land in return for military service. The Domesday Book (1086), royal castles and a centralized feudal kingship created the institutional core of the later medieval English state. "William I". Encyclopædia Britannica. The present royal house still traces its claim through this conquest. William founded a new English polity, not the United Kingdom; Wales, Scotland and Ireland remained outside it. Bates, David (2016). William the Conqueror. Yale University Press.

In Scotland, later medieval and modern tradition treated Kenneth MacAlpin (d. c. 858) as the first king to unite the Picts and the Scots, conventionally in 843. The evidence is late and the union was a dynastic construction rather than a documented institutional act, but the kingship of Alba that emerged in the ninth and tenth centuries is the origin of the Scottish state that entered the Union of 1707. Woolf, Alex (2007). From Pictland to Alba, 789–1070. Edinburgh University Press. After the wars with England, William Wallace (d. 1305) and especially Robert I (Robert the Bruce, 1274–1329), victor at Bannockburn (1314), restored an independent Scottish monarchy. The Declaration of Arbroath (1320) stated that the king ruled with the community of the realm and that sovereignty could be withdrawn from a ruler who submitted to England. These texts became founding documents of Scottish nationhood, not of the United Kingdom. Barrow, G. W. S. (2005). Robert Bruce and the Community of the Realm of Scotland (4th ed.). Edinburgh University Press.

Welsh and Irish rulers sometimes listed in older nationalist surveys were founders of their own polities, not of Britain. Owain Gwynedd (c. 1100–1170) and later Llywelyn the Great built a native principality in Wales before Edward I's conquest (1277–83) and the Statute of Rhuddlan (1284) annexed Wales to the English crown; the Laws in Wales Acts 1535 and 1542 completed legal incorporation. Davies, R. R. (2000). The Age of Conquest: Wales 1063–1415. Oxford University Press. Brian Boru (d. 1014) was a high King of Ireland. Henry II of England obtained papal warrant and, after 1171, lordship over parts of Ireland. English dominion there was a conquest, not a shared founding act. Frame, Robin (2012). Colonial Ireland, 1169–1369 (2nd ed.). Four Courts Press.

James VI and I (1566–1625) inherited the English and Irish crowns in 1603, creating the Union of the Crowns. He styled himself "King of Great Britain" and commissioned a flag and a project of parliamentary union, but England and Scotland kept separate laws, churches and parliaments. "James I". Encyclopædia Britannica. He is therefore the founder of a dynastic, not a legislative, Britain. The constitutional settlement that later made a parliamentary United Kingdom possible was the Glorious Revolution: William III and Mary II accepted the Bill of Rights 1689, which excluded a Catholic succession, subjected the Crown to statute and regular parliaments, and became a foundational text of the British constitution. Harris, Tim (2006). Revolution: The Great Crisis of the British Monarchy, 1685–1720. Penguin.

The sovereign state of Great Britain dates from the Acts of Union 1707, passed under Queen Anne after the Treaty of Union negotiated in 1706. The English and Scottish parliaments extinguished themselves and were replaced by a single Parliament of Great Britain at Westminster. The two kingdoms became "one united kingdom by the name of Great Britain," with a common succession, fiscal system and flag, while Scottish private law and the Presbyterian establishment were preserved. "Act of Union". Encyclopædia Britannica. Anne was the first monarch of the unified kingdom. The union was a negotiated statute, driven by English security concerns after the Act of Security (1704) and by Scottish economic crisis after the Darien scheme, not a war of unification. Whatley, Christopher A. (2014). The Scots and the Union (2nd ed.). Edinburgh University Press.

The Acts of Union 1800 created the United Kingdom of Great Britain and Ireland on 1 January 1801. William Pitt the Younger designed the measure during the French Revolutionary Wars and after the Irish Rebellion of 1798, abolishing the Parliament of Ireland and adding Irish MPs and peers at Westminster. Pitt resigned when George III refused Catholic emancipation, which had been part of the political bargain. Until the Irish Free State left in 1922, Great Britain and Ireland had been two kingdoms in personal union; 1801 made them one state. Geoghegan, Patrick M. (1999). The Irish Act of Union. Gill & Macmillan.

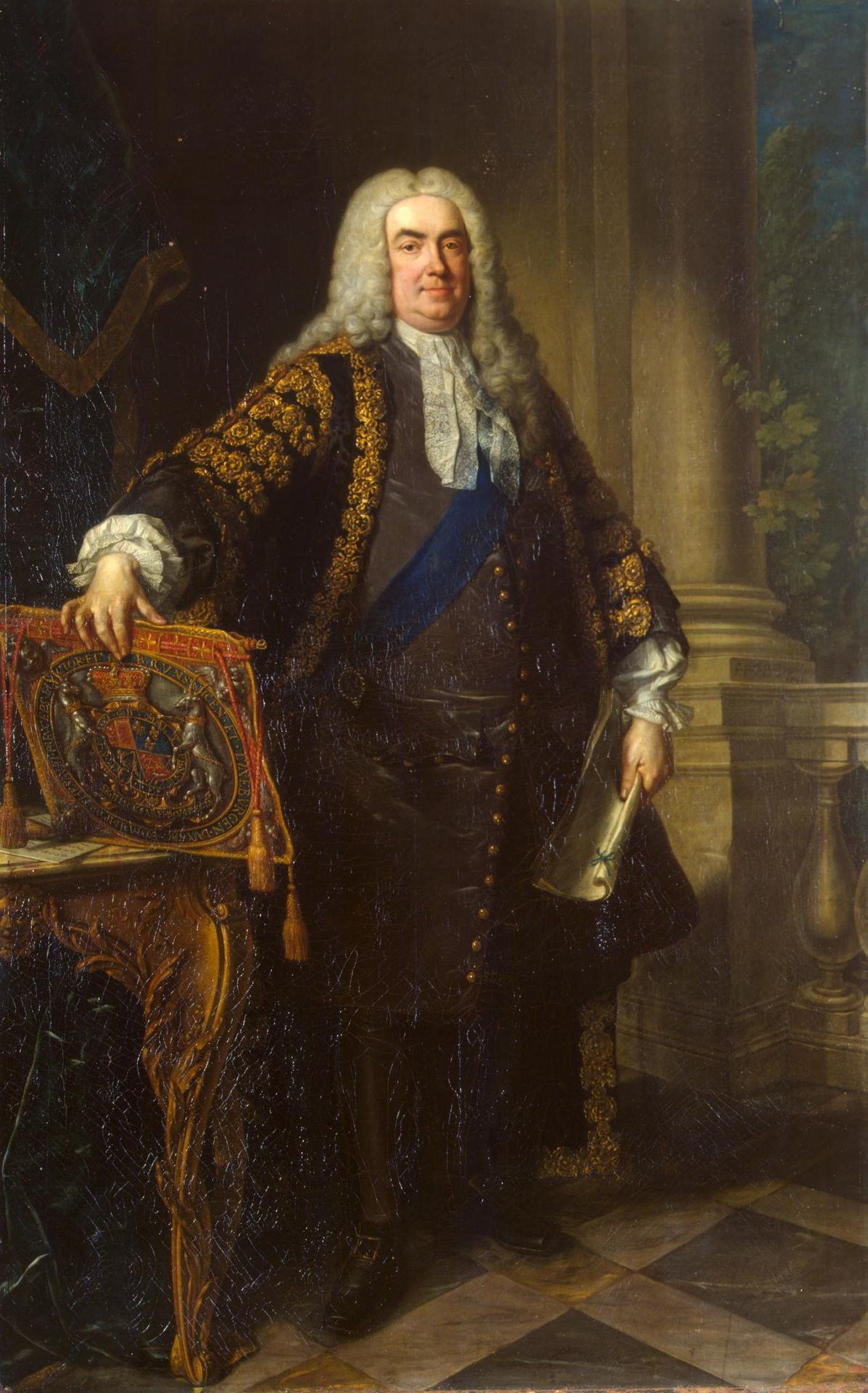
Robert Walpole.

Robert Walpole (1676–1745), First Lord of the Treasury from 1721 to 1742, is conventionally the first prime minister. The title was still unofficial, but Walpole's long command of the Commons, the Cabinet and royal patronage created the working model of a chief minister responsible for coordinating government in a parliamentary monarchy. "Robert Walpole". Encyclopædia Britannica. He did not found the United Kingdom, which already existed, but he founded its characteristic executive: cabinet government under a premier who must retain the confidence of the House of Commons. Black, Jeremy (2001). Walpole in Power. Sutton.

After the partition of Ireland (1921), unionists treated Edward Carson (1854–1935) and James Craig, 1st Viscount Craigavon (1871–1940) as founders of Northern Ireland. Carson led the Ulster Covenant (1912) against Home Rule; Craig became the first prime minister of Northern Ireland in 1921 under the Government of Ireland Act 1920. Their founding claim is that of a devolved unionist polity within the UK, not of the United Kingdom as a whole, and it is rejected by Irish nationalists. Jackson, Alvin (2003). Home Rule: An Irish History, 1800–2000. Weidenfeld & Nicolson.

Donald Dewar (1937–2000), first minister of Scotland from 1999, was the principal Labour architect of the Scotland Act 1998, which restored a Scottish Parliament after the 1997 referendum. He is often called the father of modern Scottish devolution. Like Carson and Craig, he founded a constituent institution of the contemporary UK rather than the Union of 1707 itself. Hassan, Gerry (2009). The Modern SNP: From Protest to Power. Edinburgh University Press.

== Oceania ==
=== Australia ===
==== Early colonial era ====
- Captain Arthur Phillip was the first Governor of New South Wales and founder of the first British colony in Australia.
- Governor Lachlan Macquarie is considered by historians to have had a crucial influence on the transition of New South Wales from a penal colony to a free settlement and therefore to have played a major role in the shaping of Australian society in the early 19th century.
- William Wentworth advocated for the rights of emancipists and for representative self-government; he led the drafting of New South Wales' first self-governing constitution establishing the Parliament of New South Wales, Australia's first parliament. He was among the first colonists to promote a nascent form of Australian nationalism.

==== Late colonial and federation era ====
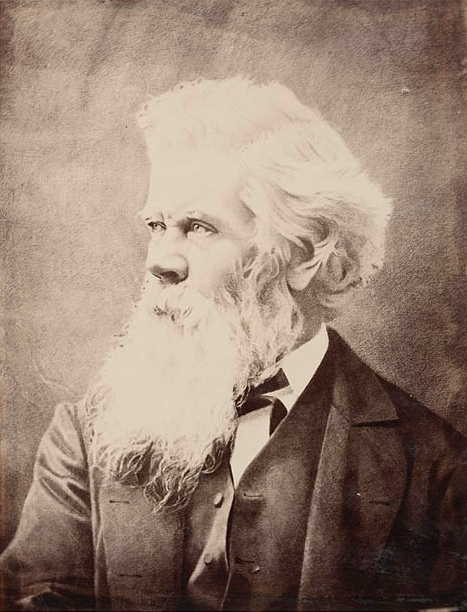
Sir Henry Parkes, colonial Australian politician, premier of New South Wales and "Father of Federation"

- Sir Henry Parkes is often regarded as the "Father of Federation" in Australia. During the late 19th century, he was the strongest proponent for a federation of Australian territories. However, he died before Australia federated, and was never able to see his plan come to fruition.
- Andrew Inglis Clark is another founding father of Australia. He largely wrote the Australian Constitution in addition to developing the Hare-Clark system of voting and pushing for universal adult suffrage and other progressive ideals that would become law early in Australia's history.
- Alfred Deakin also stands out as a significant founding father as he attended all the Federation Conferences, he gave up 10 years of senior political appointments to travel the country promoting federation and was Australia's first Attorney General. He was instrumental in securing Edmund Barton as the first Prime Minister while Deakin went on to be Australia's second, fifth and seventh prime minister. Deakin was responsible for establishing the High Court, Australian Navy, and many other important acts of parliament. Sir Robert Menzies is on record for saying he was Australia's greatest Prime Ministers.
- John Dunmore Lang. Although passing away over two decades before federation, John Dunmore Lang was a strong advocate of a federation of the Australian colonies as a democratic republic, independent from the British Empire.

=== Federated States of Micronesia ===
Chief Justice Andon Amaraich is regarded as "one of the founding fathers of the Federated States of Micronesia".

=== Fiji ===
Ratu Sir Kamisese Mara is widely viewed as the "Founding Father" of an independent Fiji.

=== Nauru ===
Hammer DeRoburt dominated the political scene for the first two decades of the republic; he served as president for most of the post-independence period until being voted out of office in 1989. Thereafter, national politics was marked by a series of weak, short-lived governments; the presidency tended to be traded among a small number of politicians.

=== New Zealand ===
By tradition, the first Polynesian migration to New Zealand left from Hawaiki in the 10th century in a Great Fleet of ocean going canoes, led by Kupe who is considered by many to be the founding figure of New Zealand. The 1840 Treaty of Waitangi between Maori people and the British Crown is considered by many to be the founding document of New Zealand, despite its not having any legal status.

=== Papua New Guinea ===
Grand Chief Sir Michael Somare is viewed as the "Founding Father" of Papua New Guinea. The leading figure during the country's transition to independence from Australia, he was Papua New Guinea's first Prime Minister.

=== Samoa ===
Pro-independence paramount chief Tupua Tamasese Lealofi III and long-serving head of state Malietoa Tanumafili II are often considered as "founding fathers" of modern Samoa.

=== Tonga ===
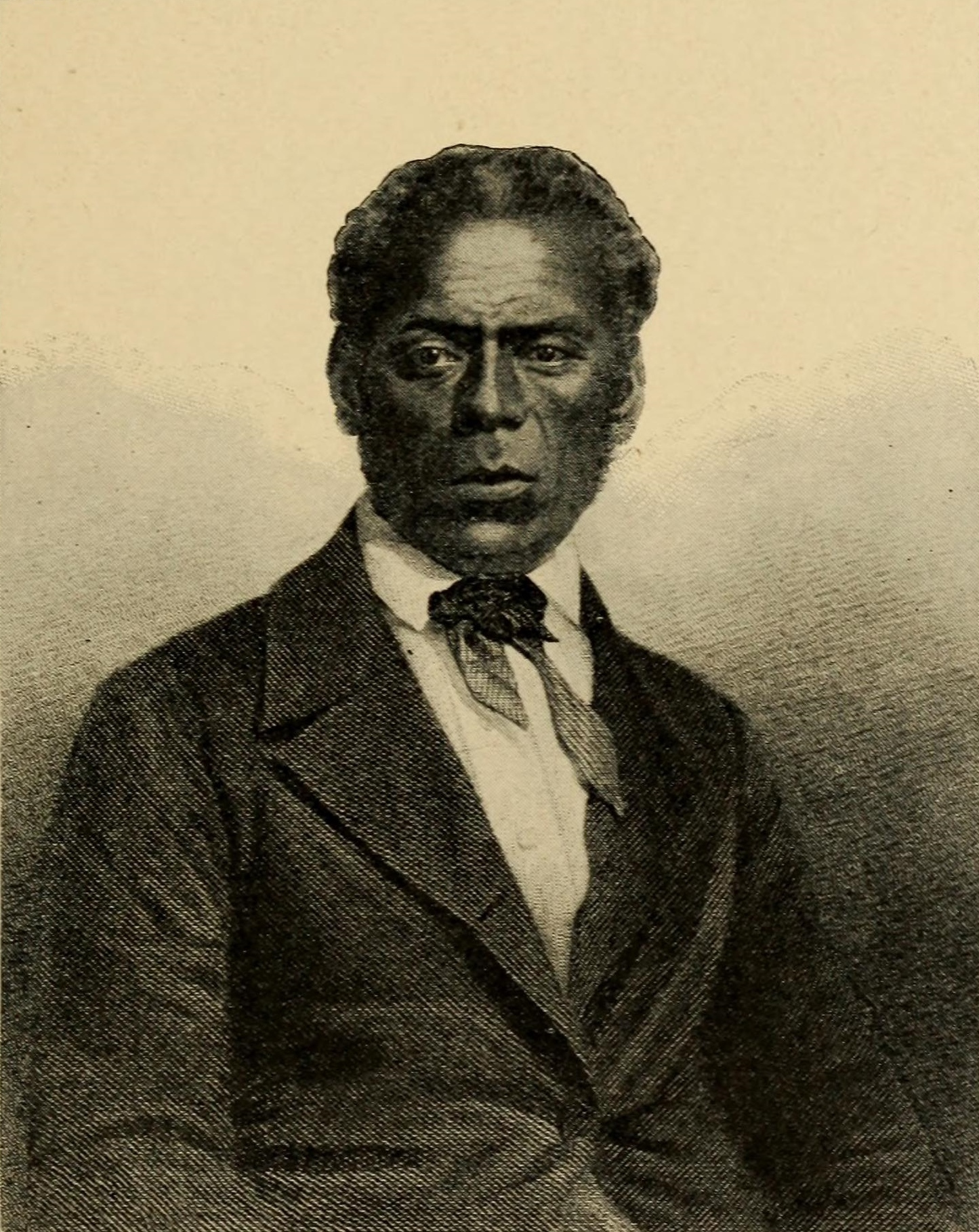
George Tupou I founded the modern Kingdom of Tonga

King George Tupou I, who united his country and established the contemporary Kingdom of Tonga, has been described as Tonga's "founding father".

== Former states and other territories ==
=== First Islamic State ===
After the Hijrah (622), the Islamic Prophet Muhammad (570–632) assumed political leadership over Yathrib, present day Medina. This feat in and of itself was unheard of, as the city consisted of both Jews and Arab pagans. Alongside consolidating his power in Medina, the Battle of Badr (624) saw the de facto leadership of Mecca destabilised. Eventually, at the Conquest of Mecca (629–630) Muhammad took leadership over his tribesmen. Furthermore, Muhammad oversaw delegations and armies sent across Arabia, including Yemen. The last Persian governor Badhan converted to Islam (628), thus including Southern Arabia under Islamic rule. Pre-Islamic Arabia was strife with tribalism and territoriality, therefore it was implausible for tribes to elect leaders let alone Arabia itself. Yet come Muhammad's death (632), Arabia was unified under one polity and religion.

Despite this state not possessing a specific name, it proved to be the platform for the Rashidun Caliphs (632–661) to eventually look beyond the Arabian Peninsula to the Byzantine and Sassanid Empires.

=== Bohemia ===
Although the first known ruler of Bohemia was Bořivoj I, Duke of Bohemia, the real unifier of various Slavic tribes in Bohemia and creator of nation was Duke Boleslaus I, Duke of Bohemia. Charles IV, Holy Roman Emperor is regarded as the "Father of the Homeland" in the Czech Republic, because during his time the Kingdom of Bohemia experienced the greatest prosperity. Tomáš Garrigue Masaryk (1850–1937) is widely revered as the Liberator President who played the chief role in the 1918 melding of Bohemia, Moravia, Slovakia and Ruthenia into the Czechoslovak Republic, and who served as President of the Republic from 1918 to 1935.

=== Republic of Biafra ===
Nigerian military officer Chukwuemeka Odumegwu Ojukwu, of the Igbo ethnic group, established the Republic of Biafra on 30 May 1967 after he seceded the predominantly Igbo region of Nigeria from the rest of the country, sparking the Nigerian Civil War.

=== Czechoslovakia ===
- Tomáš Garrigue Masaryk, first President of Czechoslovakia, known as President Liberator.

=== Kingdom of England ===
It was King Athelstan (893/95–939) who united the several Anglo-Saxon kingdoms of England around the year 927, when he became King of the English as opposed to his previous title, King of the West Saxons. However, his fame is often overshadowed by his predecessor and grandfather Alfred the Great (871–899), who set in motion the unification of the English kingdoms and could also claim to be the nation's founder.

=== Kingdom of Hawaiʻi ===
Polynesians arrived on the islands from 1000 to 1200 AD, becoming Native Hawaiians. However, it was in 1795 when King Kamehameha I conceived the Kingdom of Hawaiʻi and unified the islands, beginning modern Hawaiian history.

=== Ancient Korea ===
For ancient Korea, Hwanung (환웅/桓雄) and his son Dangun Wanggeom (단군왕검/檀君王儉) were the legendary founders of Gojoseon, the first kingdom of Korea. The founding date is usually calculated as 3 October 2333 BC; 3 October is a South Korean national holiday known as Gaecheonjeol (개천절/開天節, lit. 'Festival of the Opening of Heaven'). However, in North Korea, Gaecheonjeol is not celebrated and recognized at all, unlike South Korea.

=== Ottoman Empire ===
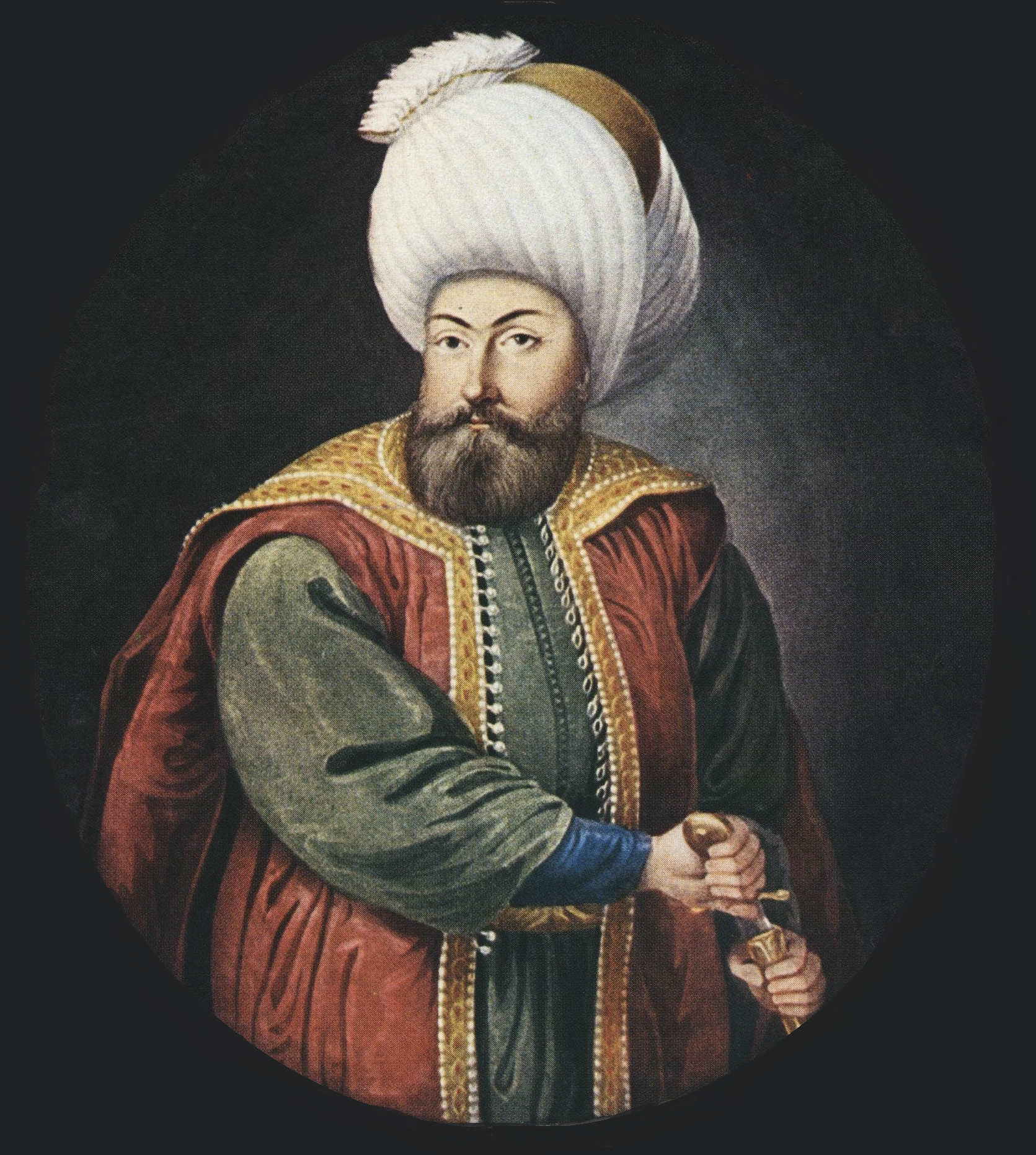
Osman I, the founding father of the Turkish Empire

By the end of the 14th century, most of Anatolia was controlled by various Anatolian beyliks due to the collapse of the Seljuk dynasty in the area. The Seljuk dynasty had established both the Seljuk Empire, which was founded by Tughril and the Sultanate of Rum, with the first one being responsible for the Turkification of Anatolia. Osman I unified the beyliks under one banner, proclaiming the Ottoman Empire.

=== Russian Empire ===
- Rurik – Varangian prince and Prince of Novgorod beginning around 862 AD
- Oleg, Rurik's kinsman and successor; extended his realm from Novgorod south to the Dnieper River valley and later moved his capital to the more strategic Kiev, where he established Kievan Rus' (the modern peoples of Belarus, Ukraine, and Russia all have Kievan Rus' as their cultural heritage).
- Ivan the Terrible, Grand Prince of Moscow (also Prince of Novgorod) from 1533 to 1547 and Tsar of All the Russias from 1547 until his death in 1584. Ivan also claimed the historical title "Grand Prince of Kiev" for himself, but this was more of a flourish, since Kiev had never formed part of his realm and Moscow would not control the Kievan region until the Truce of Andrusovo (1667), but Kiev remained an important city in early Slavic history and culture.
- Peter the Great, Tsar from 1682, officially proclaimed the establishment of the Russian Empire in 1721, following the Treaty of Nystad, and himself its first emperor. He instituted sweeping reforms and oversaw the transformation of Russia into a major European power, re-organising the state in the Western style. Founder of Saint-Petersburg
- Vladimir the Great was the first Christian Prince of Kievan Rus.

=== Kingdom of Scotland ===
It was King Kenneth MacAlpin (841–858) who united Pictland and Scotland, around the year 843, when he became King of Scots, as opposed to his previous title, King of Dál Riada. However, his fame is partly eclipsed by Malcolm III (1058–1093), who was the first king to rule over nearly all Scotland, after annexing Strathclyde.

The fictionalising medieval poem The Wallace (c. 1477) celebrated William Wallace (died 1305) as one of the founder-heroes of Scotland's struggle to preserve/re-establish independence from Plantagenet England.

=== Serbia and Montenegro ===
- Dobrica Ćosić, often referred to as the "Father of the Nation"

=== Soviet Union ===
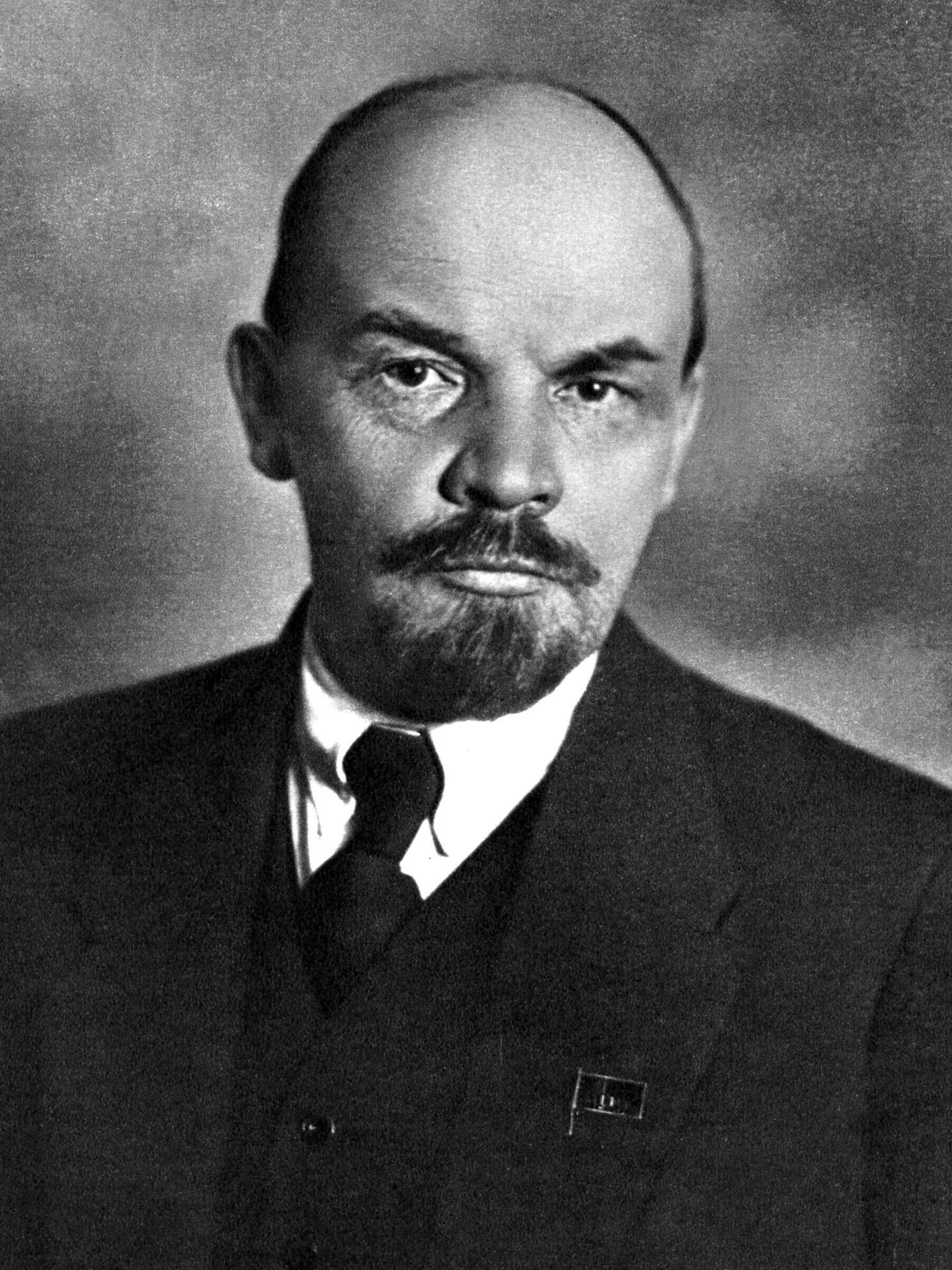
Vladimir Lenin, founder of the Soviet Union and the leader of the Bolshevik party.

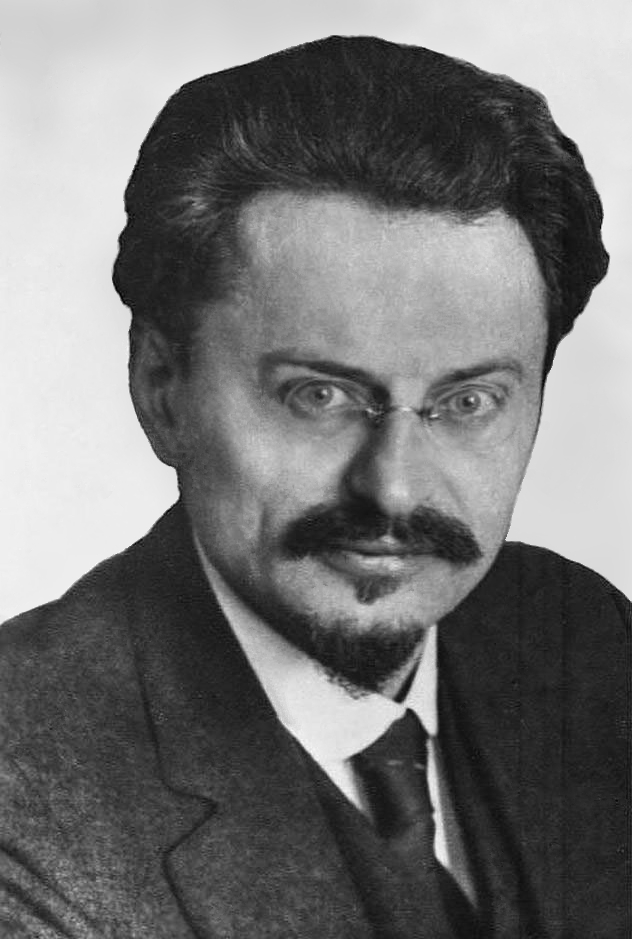
Leon Trotsky, founder of the Red Army and a key figure in the October Revolution.

- Vladimir Lenin – Officially one among many equal founders of the country, Lenin was, de facto, the paramount leader, founder of the Soviet Union and the CPSU. The party governed the Soviet Union initially through a coalition with the Left Socialist-Revolutionaries along with elected soviets but later as a one-party state over the course of the Russian Civil War and political uprisings. Lenin is also considered the founding father of the modern Russian state. He died soon after the country's founding and retained a special status of secular apotheosis for the rest of the country's history.
- Leon Trotsky – Founding Politburo member, head of the Red Army, commissar for foreign affairs, key organiser of the October Revolution. Trotsky was widely considered de facto second in command in the Soviet Union during Lenin's tenure. He was also nominated for the position of Vice-chairman of the Soviet Union on several occasions by Lenin. Trotsky was outmaneuvered by Joseph Stalin during the succession struggle, exiled and eventually assassinated in 1940.

=== Republic of Texas ===
- Sam Houston
- William B. Travis
- Lorenzo de Zavala

=== Wales ===
- Magnus Maximus (c. 335–388). According to Welsh tradition, Magnus Maximus (Welsh: Macsen-Wledig) was a Roman general who was proclaimed Emperor of Rome by his soldiers in Britain in 383. As such, he was the first Romano-British ruler of Britain and the western portions of the Roman Empire. His mytho-heroic founding of Wales is celebrated in the modern Welsh anthem Yma o Hyd by Dafydd Iwan.
- Hywel Dda (c. 880–950) was responsible for the codification of traditional Welsh Law, which, according to historian John Davies, "was a powerful symbol of [Welsh] unity and identity, as powerful, indeed, as their language".
- Gruffydd ap Llywelyn (r. 1039–63) was the first Welsh king to rule over the entire territory of Wales, from about 1057 until his death in 1063.

=== Republic of Vietnam ===
Ngô Đình Diệm (1901–1963), first president of South Vietnam.

=== Kingdom of Yugoslavia ===
King Alexander I of Yugoslavia, known as Alexander the Unifier.

=== Socialist Federal Republic of Yugoslavia ===
Josip Broz Tito, Marshal of Yugoslavia (1943–1980).

=== Union of South Africa ===
- Louis Botha was the first Prime Minister of the Union of South Africa, and Jan Smuts, its second prime minister, was a prominent advocate of unification and seen in more recent polls as the Union of South Africa's greatest historical leader.
- Jan van Riebeeck was treated as a South African founding father by the South African government during the apartheid era, being featured on statues and the country's currency (although the likeness was erroneous and was actually that of another man).

=== Zaire ===
Mobutu Sese Seko was the founder of Zaire and its only president.
