= Alexandra Chang =

Alexandra Chang may refer to:

- Alexandra Chang (writer), American writer
- Alexandra Chang (curator), American art curator, art historian, and editor
