= Bibliography of the Cultural Revolution =

- The Whole Country Is Red, a 1968 Chinese postage stamp withdrawn on its day of issue
- Subject: Cultural Revolution
- Scope: Books, journal articles, primary sources
- Period covered: 16 May 1966 – 6 October 1976
- Languages: English
- Related: Bibliography of Chinese history; Bibliography of the Cold War; Bibliography of the Russian Revolution and Civil War; Bibliography of Stalinism and the Soviet Union

Bibliography of the Cultural Revolution is a list of English-language scholarly works on the Cultural Revolution in the People's Republic of China, from the 16 May Notification to the death of Mao Zedong and the arrest of the Gang of Four in 1976.

The Cultural Revolution, formally known as the Great Proletarian Cultural Revolution, was a sociopolitical movement in the People's Republic of China (PRC). It was launched by Mao Zedong, chairman of the Chinese Communist Party, in 1966 and lasted until his death in 1976. Its stated goal was to advance Chinese communism by purging remnants of capitalist and traditional elements from Chinese society and government.

This bibliography contains academic-level English-language books (including translations) and journal articles, published mainly after World War II. (Note: Works published before World War II should be limited to areas where there are no significant post–World War II books on the subject, or where the work in question has significant historical merit.) Book entries may have references to reviews published in academic journals or major newspapers when these could be considered helpful. These reference reviews also function as a resource to find other works on this subject.

Works listed here are cited in the notes or bibliographies of scholarly sources. Each is published by an academic or major trade press, written by a recognized expert, or substantially reviewed in scholarly journals; borderline cases are omitted. A selection of primary sources is included. Many of the books below carry their own bibliographies; see Further reading section for longer ones, and External links section for historical sites and museums.

Citations follow APA style. (Note: Entries are in plain text APA 7 format without templates; templates are used only for reviews and notes.) Books have citations to academic journal or mainstream published reviews when available. For books only partly about the subject, relevant chapter or section titles are given where useful and available. Translators of the original-language edition are included when possible. In cases where a title or name has appeared with more than one English spelling, the most recent published form is used and a footnote documents any earlier title under which the work appeared.

== General surveys ==
- Barnouin, B., & Yu, C. (1993). Ten years of turbulence: The Chinese Cultural Revolution. Kegan Paul International.
- Dikötter, F. (2016). The Cultural Revolution: A people's history, 1962–1976. Bloomsbury.
- Esherick, J. W., Pickowicz, P. G., & Walder, A. G. (Eds.). (2006). The Chinese Cultural Revolution as history. Stanford University Press.
- Joseph, W. A., Wong, C. P. W., & Zweig, D. (Eds.). (1991). New perspectives on the Cultural Revolution. Council on East Asian Studies, Harvard University.
- Karnow, S. (1972). Mao and China: From revolution to revolution. Viking Press.
- Kraus, R. C. (2012). The Cultural Revolution: A very short introduction. Oxford University Press.
- Law, K. (Ed.). (2003). The Chinese Cultural Revolution reconsidered: Beyond purge and holocaust. Palgrave Macmillan.
- MacFarquhar, R., & Fairbank, J. K. (Eds.). (1991). The Cambridge history of China: Vol. 15. The People's Republic, part 2: Revolutions within the Chinese Revolution, 1966–1982. Cambridge University Press.
- MacFarquhar, R., & Schoenhals, M. (2006). Mao's last revolution. Harvard University Press.
- Robinson, T. W. (Ed.). (1971). The Cultural Revolution in China. University of California Press.
- Yan, J., & Gao, G. (1996). Turbulent decade: A history of the Cultural Revolution (D. W. Y. Kwok, Trans. & Ed.). University of Hawaii Press.
- Yang, J. (2021). The world turned upside down: A history of the Chinese Cultural Revolution (S. Mosher & J. Guo, Trans. & Eds.). Farrar, Straus and Giroux. (Original work published 2016)

== Political history ==
- Dittmer, L. (1974). Liu Shao-ch'i and the Chinese Cultural Revolution: The politics of mass criticism. University of California Press.
- Domes, J. (1977). China after the Cultural Revolution: Politics between two party congresses (A. Berg & D. Goodman, Trans.). University of California Press.
- Gao, W. (2007). Zhou Enlai: The last perfect revolutionary: A biography (P. Rand & L. R. Sullivan, Trans.). PublicAffairs. (Original work published 2003)
- Jin, Q. (1999). The culture of power: The Lin Biao incident in the Cultural Revolution. Stanford University Press.
- Kau, M. Y. M. (Ed.). (1975). The Lin Piao affair: Power politics and military coup. International Arts and Sciences Press.
- Schoenhals, M. (1996). The Central Case Examination Group, 1966–79. The China Quarterly, 145, 87–111. doi:10.1017/s0305741000044143
- Schoenhals, M. (2005). "Why don't we arm the left?" Mao's culpability for the Cultural Revolution's "great chaos" of 1967. The China Quarterly, 182, 277–300. doi:10.1017/s0305741005000196
- Schoenhals, M. (2013). Spying for the people: Mao's secret agents, 1949–1967. Cambridge University Press.
- Teiwes, F. C., & Sun, W. (1996). The tragedy of Lin Biao: Riding the tiger during the Cultural Revolution, 1966–1971. Hurst.
- Teiwes, F. C., & Sun, W. (2004). The first Tiananmen incident revisited: Elite politics and crisis management at the end of the Maoist era. Pacific Affairs, 77(2), 211–235. doi:10.1080/17153379.2004.12553978
- Teiwes, F. C., & Sun, W. (2007). The end of the Maoist era: Chinese politics during the twilight of the Cultural Revolution, 1972–1976. M. E. Sharpe.
- Terrill, R. (1984). The white-boned demon: A biography of Madame Mao Zedong. William Morrow.
- Tsou, T. (1969). The Cultural Revolution and the Chinese political system. The China Quarterly, 38, 63–91. doi:10.1017/s0305741000049146
- Tsou, T. (1986). The Cultural Revolution and post-Mao reforms: A historical perspective. University of Chicago Press.
- Walder, A. G. (2014). Rebellion and repression in China, 1966–1971. Social Science History, 38(3–4), 513–539. doi:10.1017/ssh.2015.23
- Walder, A. G. (2019). Agents of disorder: Inside China's Cultural Revolution. Harvard University Press.
- Walder, A. G., & Lu, Q. (2017). The dynamics of collapse in an authoritarian regime: China in 1967. American Journal of Sociology, 122(4), 1144–1182. doi:10.1086/690053
- Witke, R. (1977). Comrade Chiang Ch'ing. Little, Brown.

== Provincial surveys ==
- Brown, K. (2006). The purge of the Inner Mongolian People's Party in the Chinese Cultural Revolution, 1967–69: A function of language, power and violence. Global Oriental.
- Brown, K. (2007). The Cultural Revolution in Inner Mongolia 1967–1969: The purge of the "heirs of Genghis Khan". Asian Affairs, 38(2), 173–187. doi:10.1080/03068370701349128
- Cheng, T., Bulag, U. E., & Selden, M. (2023). A Chinese rebel beyond the Great Wall: The Cultural Revolution and ethnic pogrom in Inner Mongolia. University of Chicago Press.
- Dong, G., & Walder, A. G. (2012). Nanjing's "second Cultural Revolution" of 1974. The China Quarterly, 212, 893–918. doi:10.1017/s0305741012001191
- Dong, G., & Walder, A. G. (2014). Foreshocks: Local origins of Nanjing's Qingming demonstrations of 1976. The China Quarterly, 220, 1092–1110. doi:10.1017/S0305741014001180
- Dong, G., & Walder, A. G. (2018). Forces of disorder: The army in Xuzhou's factional warfare, 1967–1969. Modern China, 44(2), 139–169. doi:10.1177/0097700417729123
- Dong, G., & Walder, A. G. (2021). A decade of upheaval: The Cultural Revolution in rural China. Princeton University Press.
- Forster, K. (1990). Rebellion and factionalism in a Chinese province: Zhejiang, 1966–1976. M. E. Sharpe.
- Goldstein, M. C., Jiao, B., & Lhundrup, T. (2009). On the Cultural Revolution in Tibet: The Nyemo incident of 1969. University of California Press.
- Robinson, T. W. (1971). The Wuhan incident: Local strife and provincial rebellion during the Cultural Revolution. The China Quarterly, 47, 413–438. doi:10.1017/s0305741000006172
- Su, Y. (2011). Collective killings in rural China during the Cultural Revolution. Cambridge University Press.
- Tan, H. (2017). The killing wind: A Chinese county's descent into madness during the Cultural Revolution (S. Mosher & J. Guo, Trans.). Oxford University Press.
- Unger, J. (1998). Cultural Revolution conflict in the villages. The China Quarterly, 153, 82–106. doi:10.1017/S030574100000299X
- Walder, A. G., & Su, Y. (2003). The Cultural Revolution in the countryside: Scope, timing and human impact. The China Quarterly, 173, 74–99. doi:10.1017/s0009443903000068
- Wang, S. (1995). Failure of charisma: The Cultural Revolution in Wuhan. Oxford University Press.
- Zheng, Y. (1996). Scarlet memorial: Tales of cannibalism in modern China (T. P. Sym, Ed. & Trans.). Westview Press.

== Factions ==
=== Red guards ===
- Chan, A. (1985). Children of Mao: Personality development and political activism in the Red Guard generation. Macmillan.
- Chan, A., Rosen, S., & Unger, J. (1980). Students and class warfare: The social roots of the Red Guard conflict in Guangzhou (Canton). The China Quarterly, 83, 397–446. doi:10.1017/s030574100001290x
- Hinton, W. (1972). Hundred day war: The Cultural Revolution at Tsinghua University. Monthly Review Press.
- Lee, H. Y. (1978). The politics of the Chinese Cultural Revolution: A case study. University of California Press.
- Nee, V., & Layman, D. (1969). The Cultural Revolution at Peking University. Monthly Review Press.
- Rosen, S. (1982). Red Guard factionalism and the Cultural Revolution in Guangzhou (Canton). Westview Press.
- Walder, A. G. (2002). Beijing Red Guard factionalism: Social interpretations reconsidered. The Journal of Asian Studies, 61(2), 437–471. JSTOR 2700297
- Walder, A. G. (2006). Ambiguity and choice in political movements: The origins of Beijing Red Guard factionalism. American Journal of Sociology, 112(3), 710–750. doi:10.1086/507854
- Walder, A. G. (2009). Fractured rebellion: The Beijing Red Guard movement. Harvard University Press.
- Yang, G. (2016). The Red Guard generation and political activism in China. Columbia University Press.

=== Youth ===
- Bernstein, T. P. (1977). Up to the mountains and down to the villages: The transfer of youth from urban to rural China. Yale University Press.
- Bonnin, M. (2013). The lost generation: The rustication of China's educated youth (1968–1980) (K. Horko, Trans.). Chinese University Press.
- Gold, T. B. (1980). Back to the city: The return of Shanghai's educated youth. The China Quarterly, 84, 755–770. doi:10.1017/s0305741000012662
- Honig, E., & Zhao, X. (2015). Sent-down youth and rural economic development in Maoist China. The China Quarterly, 222, 499–521. doi:10.1017/s0305741015000363
- Honig, E., & Zhao, X. (2019). Across the great divide: The sent-down youth movement in Mao's China, 1968–1980. Cambridge University Press.
- Pan, Y. (2003). Tempered in the revolutionary furnace: China's youth in the rustication movement. Lexington Books.
- Rene, H. K. (2013). China's sent-down generation: Public administration and the legacies of Mao's rustication program. Georgetown University Press.
- Shirk, S. L. (1982). Competitive comrades: Career incentives and student strategies in China. University of California Press.
- Singer, M. (1971). Educated youth and the Cultural Revolution in China. Center for Chinese Studies, University of Michigan.
- Unger, J. (1982). Education under Mao: Class and competition in Canton schools, 1960–1980. Columbia University Press.
- Zhou, X., & Hou, L. (1999). Children of the Cultural Revolution: The state and the life course in the People's Republic of China. American Sociological Review, 64(1), 12–36. doi:10.1177/000312249906400103

=== Other ===
- Perry, E. J., & Li, X. (1997). Proletarian power: Shanghai in the Cultural Revolution. Westview Press.
- Walder, A. G. (1978). Chang Ch'un-ch'iao and Shanghai's January Revolution. Center for Chinese Studies, University of Michigan.
- White, L. T., III. (1989). Policies of chaos: The organizational causes of violence in China's Cultural Revolution. Princeton University Press.
- Wu, Y. (2014). The Cultural Revolution at the margins: Chinese socialism in crisis. Harvard University Press.

== Society ==
- Andreas, J. (2009). Rise of the red engineers: The Cultural Revolution and the origins of China's new class. Stanford University Press.
- Dikötter, F. (2016). The silent revolution: Decollectivization from below during the Cultural Revolution. The China Quarterly, 227, 796–811. doi:10.1017/s0305741016000746
- Han, D. (2000). The unknown Cultural Revolution: Educational reforms and their impact on China's rural development. Garland.
- Kraus, R. C. (1981). Class conflict in Chinese socialism. Columbia University Press.
- Madsen, R. (1984). Morality and power in a Chinese village. University of California Press.
- Wemheuer, F. (2019). A social history of Maoist China: Conflict and change, 1949–1976. Cambridge University Press.

== Cultural history ==
- Clark, P. (2008). The Chinese Cultural Revolution: A history. Cambridge University Press.
- Clark, P., Pang, L., & Tsai, T.-H. (Eds.). (2016). Listening to China's Cultural Revolution: Music, politics, and cultural continuities. Palgrave Macmillan.
- Cook, A. C. (Ed.). (2014). Mao's Little Red Book: A global history. Cambridge University Press.
- Dittmer, L. (1977). Thought reform and cultural revolution: An analysis of the symbolism of Chinese polemics. American Political Science Review, 71(1), 67–85. JSTOR 1956954
- Dittmer, L., & Chen, R. (1981). Ethics and rhetoric of the Chinese Cultural Revolution. Center for Chinese Studies, University of California.
- Evans, H., & Donald, S. (Eds.). (1999). Picturing power in the People's Republic of China: Posters of the Cultural Revolution. Rowman & Littlefield.
- Ho, D. Y. (2018). Curating revolution: Politics on display in Mao's China. Cambridge University Press.
- King, R. (Ed.). (2010). Art in turmoil: The Chinese Cultural Revolution, 1966–76. UBC Press.
- Leese, D. (2011). Mao cult: Rhetoric and ritual in China's Cultural Revolution. Cambridge University Press.
- Lu, X. (2004). Rhetoric of the Chinese Cultural Revolution: The impact on Chinese thought, culture, and communication. University of South Carolina Press.
- Mittler, B. (2012). A continuous revolution: Making sense of Cultural Revolution culture. Harvard University Asia Center.
- Pang, L. (2017). The art of cloning: Creative production during China's Cultural Revolution. Verso.
- Roberts, R. A. (2010). Maoist model theatre: The semiotics of gender and sexuality in the Chinese Cultural Revolution (1966–1976). Brill.
- Russo, A. (2020). Cultural Revolution and revolutionary culture. Duke University Press.
- Schrift, M. (2001). Biography of a Chairman Mao badge: The creation and mass consumption of a personality cult. Rutgers University Press.

== Foreign relations ==
- Barnouin, B., & Yu, C. (1998). Chinese foreign policy during the Cultural Revolution. Kegan Paul International.
- Burr, W. (2001). Sino-American relations, 1969: The Sino-Soviet border war and steps towards rapprochement. Cold War History, 1(3), 73–112. doi:10.1080/713999930
- Goh, E. (2005). Constructing the U.S. rapprochement with China, 1961–1974: From "red menace" to "tacit ally". Cambridge University Press.
- Goldstein, L. J. (2001). Return to Zhenbao Island: Who started shooting and why it matters. The China Quarterly, 168, 985–997. doi:10.1017/s0009443901000572
- Ma, J. (2004). The Cultural Revolution in the Foreign Ministry of China. Chinese University Press.
- MacMillan, M. (2007). Nixon and Mao: The week that changed the world. Random House.
- Tudda, C. (2012). A Cold War turning point: Nixon and China, 1969–1972. Louisiana State University Press.
- Wolin, R. (2010). The wind from the East: French intellectuals, the Cultural Revolution, and the legacy of the 1960s. Princeton University Press.
- Yang, K. (2000). The Sino-Soviet border clash of 1969: From Zhenbao Island to Sino-American rapprochement. Cold War History, 1(1), 21–52. doi:10.1080/713999906
- Zhai, Q. (2000). China and the Vietnam wars, 1950–1975. University of North Carolina Press.

== Historiography and memory ==
=== Historiography ===
- Chong, W. L. (Ed.). (2002). China's Great Proletarian Cultural Revolution: Master narratives and post-Mao counternarratives. Rowman & Littlefield.
- Dittmer, L. (1996). The Chinese Cultural Revolution revisited: The role of the nemesis. Journal of Contemporary China, 5(13), 255–268. doi:10.1080/10670569608724254
- Gao, M. (2008). The battle for China's past: Mao and the Cultural Revolution. Pluto Press.
- Ho, D. Y. (2014). Culture, class, and revolution in China's turbulent decade: A Cultural Revolution state of the field. History Compass, 12(3), 226–238. doi:10.1111/hic3.12150
- Walder, A. G. (2016). Bending the arc of Chinese history: The Cultural Revolution's paradoxical legacy. The China Quarterly, 227, 613–631. doi:10.1017/S0305741016000709

=== Memory studies ===
- Barmé, G. R. (1996). Shades of Mao: The posthumous cult of the great leader. M. E. Sharpe.
- Bonnin, M. (2016). Restricted, distorted but alive: The memory of the "lost generation" of Chinese educated youth. The China Quarterly, 227, 752–772. doi:10.1017/s0305741016001053
- Li, J. (2020). Utopian ruins: A memorial museum of the Mao era. Duke University Press.
- Veg, S. (Ed.). (2019). Popular memories of the Mao era: From critical debate to reassessing history. Hong Kong University Press.

== Miscellaneous ==
- Guo, J., Song, Y., & Zhou, Y. (Eds.). (2006). Historical dictionary of the Chinese Cultural Revolution. Scarecrow Press.

== Primary sources ==
Primary sources include writings and speeches by party leaders, memoirs and oral histories of participants and victims, and official documents of the Chinese Communist Party.

=== Works by ===
- Lin, B. (1965). Long live the victory of people's war! Foreign Languages Press.
- Liu, S. (1968–1969). Collected works of Liu Shao-ch'i (Vols. 1–3). Union Research Institute.
- Mao, T. (1966). Quotations from Chairman Mao Tse-tung. Foreign Languages Press.
- Mao, T. (1974). Chairman Mao talks to the people: Talks and letters, 1956–1971 (S. Schram, Ed.; J. Chinnery & Tieyun, Trans.). Pantheon Books. (Note: Published in the United Kingdom by Penguin in 1974 as Mao Tse-tung unrehearsed: Talks and letters, 1956–71.)
- Mao, T. (1977). Selected works of Mao Tse-tung (Vol. 5). Foreign Languages Press.

=== Memoirs ===
- Ba, J. (1984). Random thoughts (G. Barmé, Trans.). Joint Publishing.
- Bennett, G. A., & Montaperto, R. N. (1971). Red Guard: The political biography of Dai Hsiao-ai. Doubleday.
- Chang, J. (1991). Wild swans: Three daughters of China. HarperCollins.
- Cheng, N. (1986). Life and death in Shanghai. Grafton Books.
- Feng, J. (1991). Voices from the whirlwind: An oral history of the Chinese Cultural Revolution. Pantheon Books. (Original work published 1987)
- Feng, J. (1996). Ten years of madness: Oral histories of China's Cultural Revolution. China Books & Periodicals. (Original work published 1987)
- Gao, Y. (1987). Born red: A chronicle of the Cultural Revolution. Stanford University Press.
- Li, Z. (1994). The private life of Chairman Mao: The memoirs of Mao's personal physician (H.-C. Tai, Trans.). Random House.
- Liang, H., & Shapiro, J. (1983). Son of the revolution. Knopf.
- Ling, K. (1972). The revenge of heaven: Journal of a young Chinese. Putnam. (Note: English text prepared by Miriam London and Ta-ling Lee. Also published in the United Kingdom by Macdonald in 1972 as Red Guard: From schoolboy to "little general" in Mao's China.)
- Min, A. (1994). Red azalea. Pantheon Books.
- Rittenberg, S., & Bennett, A. (1993). The man who stayed behind. Simon & Schuster.
- Wu, N., & Li, Y. (1993). A single tear: A family's persecution, love, and endurance in Communist China. Atlantic Monthly Press.
- Yang, J. (1984). Six chapters from my life "downunder" (H. Goldblatt, Trans.). University of Washington Press. (Original work published 1981) (Note: First translated by Geremie Barmé with the assistance of Bennett Lee as A cadre school life: Six chapters (Joint Publishing, 1982).)
- Yang, R. (1997). Spider eaters: A memoir. University of California Press.
- Zhai, Z. (1992). Red flower of China: An autobiography. Soho Press.

=== Government documents ===
- A great trial in Chinese history: The trial of the Lin Biao and Jiang Qing counter-revolutionary cliques, Nov. 1980–Jan. 1981. (1981). New World Press.
- Important documents on the Great Proletarian Cultural Revolution in China. (1970). Foreign Languages Press.
- Milton, D., Milton, N., & Schurmann, F. (Eds.). (1974). People's China: Social experimentation, politics, entry onto the world scene, 1966 through 1972. Random House.
- Myers, J. T., Domes, J., & von Groeling, E. (Eds.). (1986). Chinese politics: Documents and analysis: Vol. 1. Cultural Revolution to 1969. University of South Carolina Press.
- Myers, J. T., Domes, J., & Yeh, M. D. (Eds.). (1989). Chinese politics: Documents and analysis: Vol. 2. Ninth Party Congress (1969) to the death of Mao (1976). University of South Carolina Press.
- The Ninth National Congress of the Communist Party of China (documents). (1969). Foreign Languages Press.
- Resolution on CPC history (1949–81). (1981). Foreign Languages Press. (Note: Contains the full text of the Resolution on Certain Questions in the History of Our Party since the Founding of the People's Republic of China, adopted by the Sixth Plenary Session of the 11th Central Committee in June 1981.)
- Schoenhals, M. (Ed.). (1996). China's Cultural Revolution, 1966–1969: Not a dinner party. M. E. Sharpe.
- Selden, M. (Ed.). (1979). The People's Republic of China: A documentary history of revolutionary change. Monthly Review Press.
- Song, Y. (Ed.). (2002). The Chinese Cultural Revolution database [CD-ROM]. Universities Service Centre for China Studies, Chinese University of Hong Kong.
- The Tenth National Congress of the Communist Party of China (documents). (1973). Foreign Languages Press.
- Union Research Institute. (1968). CCP documents of the Great Proletarian Cultural Revolution, 1966–1967. Union Research Institute.

== See also ==
- 1976 Tiananmen incident
- Bibliography of Chinese history
- Boluan Fanzheng
- Cleansing the Class Ranks
- Criticize Lin, Criticize Confucius
- Cultural Revolution Group
- Down to the Countryside Movement
- Evaluation of the Cultural Revolution
- Four Olds
- Gang of Four
- January Storm
- Lin Biao incident
- Mao Zedong's cult of personality
- Red Guards
- Revolutionary committee (China)
- Eight model plays
- Scar literature
- Struggle session
