= Evaluation of the Cultural Revolution =

After the Cultural Revolution (1966–1976), which was launched by Mao Zedong and his supporters, the People's Republic of China went through the Boluan Fanzheng period and started its Reform and Opening period in the late 1970s and early 1980s. Various evaluations and studies on the Cultural Revolution have since emerged and continued to appear, both within and outside mainland China. During general secretaryship of Xi Jinping, evaluation and open discussion of the Cultural Revolution in China has been censored.

== Academic evaluations ==
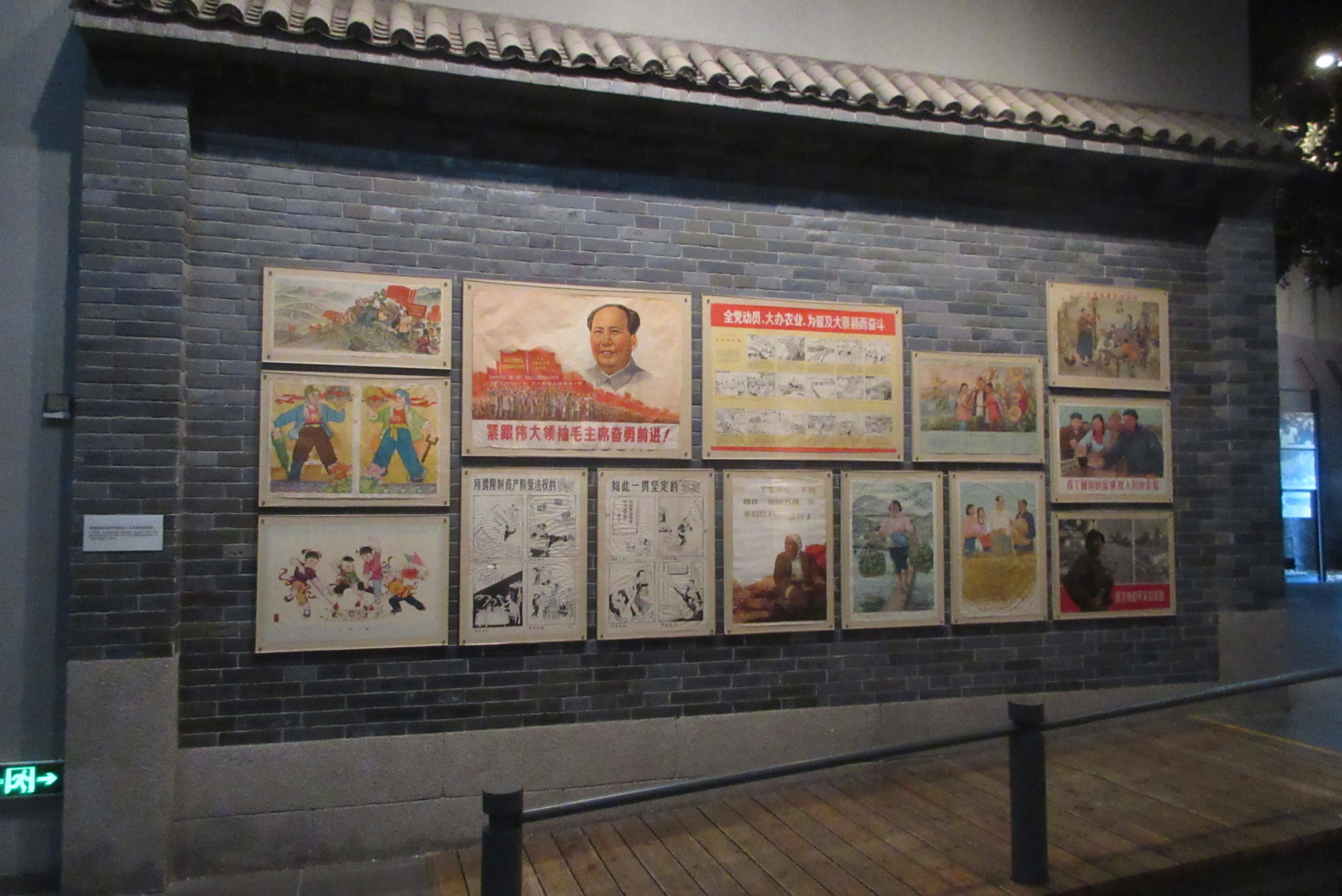
The Cultural Revolution period before Reform and Opening (Shenzhen Museum)

Scholars and academics debate the origin, the events, Mao's role, and its legacy. These debates evolved as researchers explored new sources. In the 1960s, while many scholars dismissed Mao's initiatives as ideological and destructive, others sympathized with his goals. They saw Maoism as a populist insistence on mass participation, mass criticism and the right to rebel, and a determination to wipe out a new ruling class. By the 1980s, however, sociologist Andrew Walder wrote that the "public opinion in the field had changed markedly". Most in the field now "seem convinced that the Cultural Revolution was a human disaster, even a historical crime, something on the order of Hitler's holocaust and Stalin's great terror."

Walder argued that the failures of the Cultural Revolution did not come from poor implementation, bureaucratic sabotage, disloyalty, or lingering class antagonisms. If things turned out differently than Mao expected, Walder concluded, this was "probably due to the fact that Mao did not know what he wanted, or that he did know what he was doing, or both ... the outcomes are what one should have expected, given the Maoist doctrine and aims."

The debate continues because the movement contains many contradictions: led by an all-powerful omnipresent leader, it was mainly driven by a series of grassroots popular uprisings. Many English-language books published since the 1980s paint a negative picture of the movement. Historian Anne F. Thurston wrote that it "led to loss of culture, and of spiritual values; loss of hope and ideals; loss of time, truth and of life". Barnouin and Yu summarized the Cultural Revolution as "a political movement that produced unprecedented social divisions, mass mobilization, hysteria, upheavals, arbitrary cruelty, torture, killings, and even civil war", calling Mao "one of the most tyrannical despots of the twentieth century". According to historian Chun Lin, despite these human tragedies, individual freedoms and political self-organization expanded rapidly.

Some scholars challenge the mainstream portrayals and conceive it in a more positive light. Gao Mobo, writing in The Battle for China's Past: Mao and the Cultural Revolution, argues that the movement benefited millions of Chinese citizens, particularly agricultural and industrial workers, and sees it as egalitarian and genuinely populist, citing continued Maoist nostalgia today as remnants of its positive legacy. Some draw a distinction between intention and performance. While Mao's leadership was pivotal at the beginning of the movement, Jin Qiu contends that as events progressed, it deviated significantly from Mao's utopian vision. In this sense, the Cultural Revolution was actually a decentralized and varied movement that gradually lost cohesion, spawning many 'local revolutions' that differed in their nature and goals.

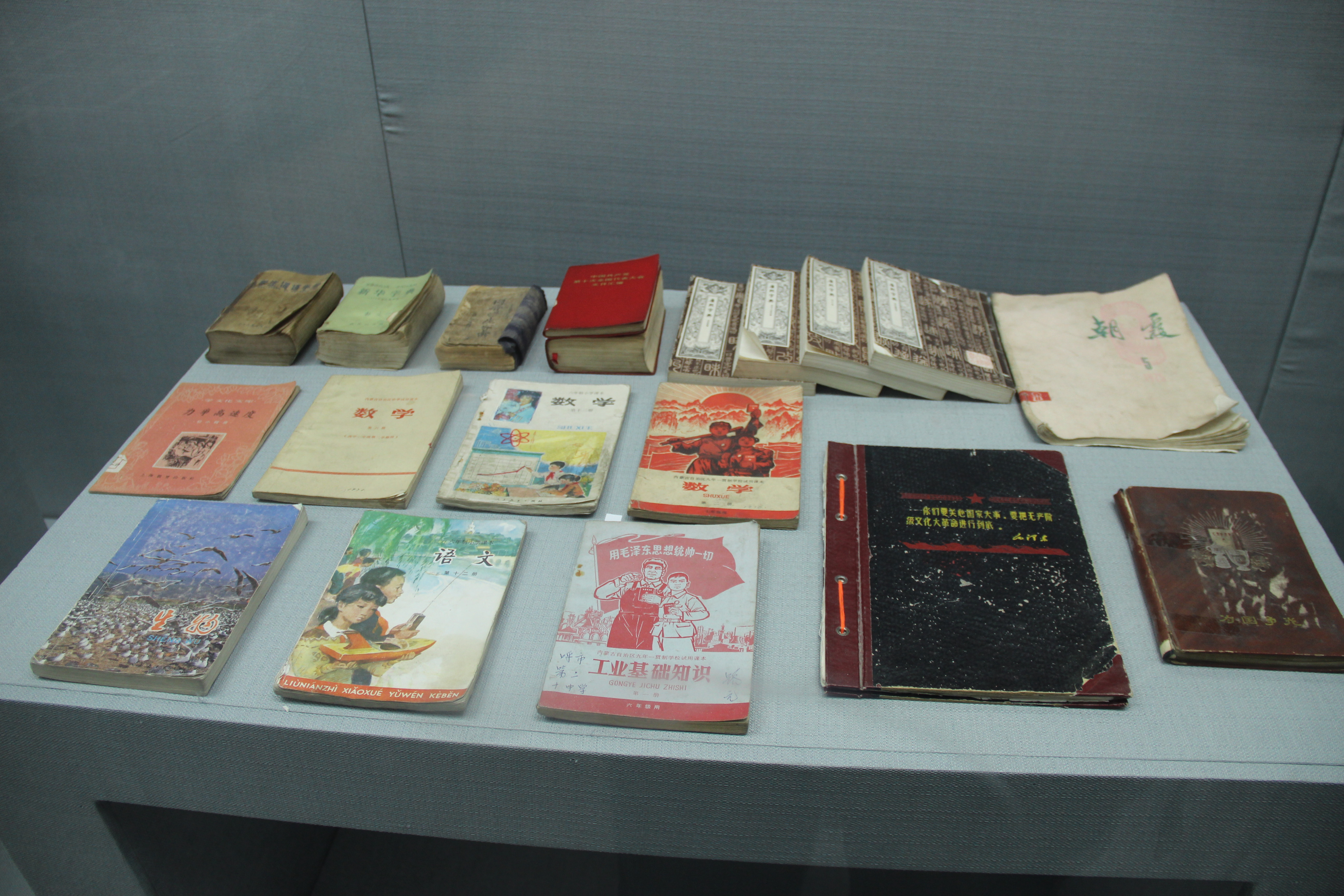
Some school textbooks during the Cultural Revolution (Inner Mongolia Museum in Hohhot)

Academic interest focused on the movement's relationship with Mao's personality. Mao envisioned himself as a wartime guerrilla leader, which made him wary of the bureaucratic nature of peacetime governance. With the Cultural Revolution Mao was simply "returning to form", once again acting as a guerrilla leader fighting an institutionalized bureaucracy. Roderick MacFarquhar and Michael Schoenhals, paint the movement as neither a bona fide war over ideological purity nor a mere power struggle to remove Mao's political rivals.

While Mao's personal motivations were undoubtedly pivotal, they reasoned that other factors contributed to the way events unfolded. These include China's relationship with the global communist movement, geopolitical concerns, the Sino-Soviet Split, Khrushchev's ouster, and Great Leap Forward catastrophe. They conclude that the movement was, at least in part, a legacy project to cement Mao's place in history, aimed to boost his prestige while he was alive and preserve his ideas after his death.

Varying academic focuses on power conflicts or clashes of personalities as underlying Mao's motivations, or alternatively on ideological reasons for launching the Cultural Revolution, are not necessarily conflicting. Mao's suspicions of those in power around him reflected his longstanding concerns with the decline of revolutionary spirit and the potential rise of a new class-stratified society arising as the popular revolutionary movement transformed into a socialist bureaucracy. Historian Rebecca Karl writes that for Mao, the pursuit of power was never an end in itself, but rather the seizure of state power was to be used in making the revolution.

Professor Yiching Wu argues that the typical historiography of the Cultural Revolution as an "era of madness" is simpleminded but writes that such narratives have a "remarkably tenacious ideological power:"

Since the early 1980s, there have been concerted efforts to reduce the extraordinary complexity of the Cultural Revolution to the simplicity almost exclusively of barbarism, violence, and human suffering. Flattening historical memory of the Cultural Revolution through moralistic condemnation and exhortation, these narratives not only deprive an immensely important and complex episode of Chinese history of its multilayered historicity, but also provide the discursive ground for delegitimizing China's revolutionary history of the twentieth century.

== Chinese Communist Party ==
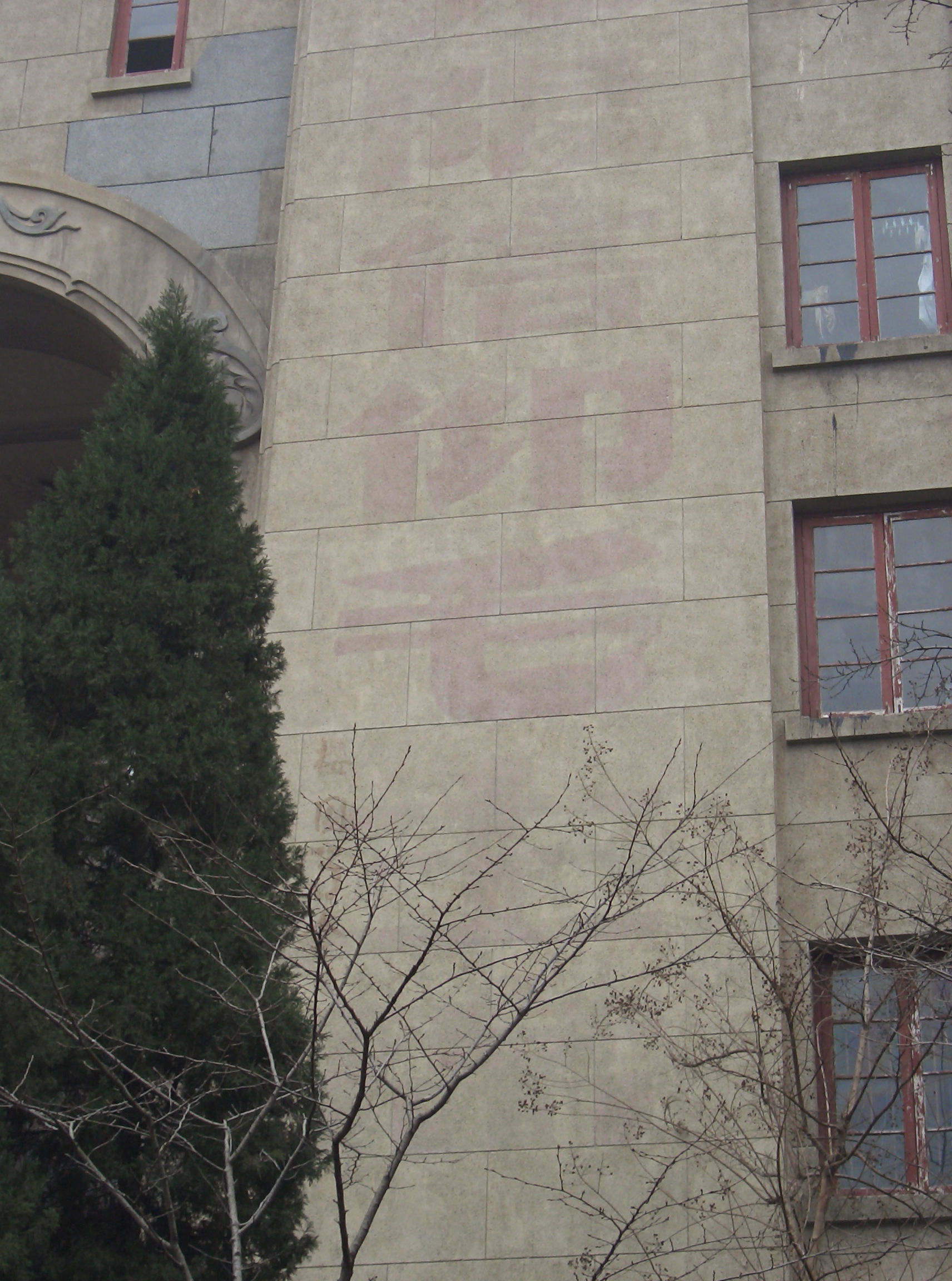
The central section of this wall shows the faint remnant marks of a propaganda slogan that was added during the Cultural Revolution, but has since been removed. The slogan read "Boundless faith that in Chairman Mao."

To make sense of the chaos caused by Mao's leadership without undermining the Chinese Communist Party CCP's authority and legitimacy, Mao's successors needed to provide a "proper" historical judgment. On 27 June 1981, the Central Committee adopted the Resolution on Certain Questions in the History of Our Party Since the Founding of the People's Republic of China, an official assessment of major historical events since 1949. This document became the official interpretation of the Cultural Revolution.

The 1981 Resolution noted Mao's leadership role in the movement, stating that "chief responsibility for the grave 'Left' error of the 'Cultural Revolution,' an error comprehensive in magnitude and protracted in duration, does indeed lie with Comrade Mao Zedong". It diluted blame by asserting that the movement was "manipulated by the counterrevolutionary groups of Lin Biao and Jiang Qing", who caused its worst excesses. The Resolution affirmed that the Cultural Revolution "brought serious disaster and turmoil to the Communist Party and the Chinese people." These themes of "turmoil" and "disaster" underlie historical and popular understanding of the Cultural Revolution. The Resolution was followed by a three-year campaign to "totally negate" the Cultural Revolution. The CCP called on individuals and cooperatives to study the Resolution and engage in criticism and self-criticism. People were urged to root out followers of Lin Biao and the Gang of Four, those seriously impacted by factional ideas, and the "smashers and grabbers" of the Cultural Revolution.

The official view in the Resolution and elsewhere aimed to separate Mao's actions during the Cultural Revolution from his "heroic" revolutionary activities during the Chinese Civil War and the Second Sino-Japanese War. It also separated Mao's personal mistakes from the correctness of the theory that he created, going as far as to rationalize that the Cultural Revolution contravened the spirit of Mao Zedong Thought, which remains the official guiding ideology. Deng famously summed this up with the phrase "Mao was 70% good, 30% bad."

CCP ideology characterizes the Cultural Revolution as an aberration and a period of chaos. The official view is the dominant framework for historiography of the period; alternative are discouraged. A new genre of literature known as scar literature emerged, encouraged by the post-Mao government. Written mainly by educated youth such as Liu Xinhua, Zhang Xianliang, and Liu Xinwu, scar literature depicted the Cultural Revolution negatively, based on their own perspectives and experiences. Movies criticizing Cultural Revolution hardliners were prevalent from the late 1970s to the early 1980s, although they were later banned by the authorities as promoting "historical nihilism."

After the 1989 Tiananmen Square protests and massacre, both liberals and conservatives within the CCP accused each other of excesses that they claimed were reminiscent of the Cultural Revolution. Li Peng, who promoted the use of military force, claimed that the student movement had taken inspiration from the populism of the Cultural Revolution and that if left unchecked, would eventually lead to mass chaos. Zhao Ziyang, who was sympathetic to the protestors, later accused his political opponents of illegally removing him from office by using "Cultural Revolution-style" tactics, including "reversing black and white, exaggerating personal offenses, taking quotes out of context, issuing slander and lies ... inundating the newspapers with critical articles making me out to be an enemy, and casual disregard for my personal freedoms." Speaking during his 1992 Southern Tour, Deng Xiaoping characterized the Cultural Revolution as civil war and contrasting it with the contemporary situation: "Why was it that our country could remain stable after the 4 June Incident? It was precisely because we had carried out the reform and the open policy, which have promoted economic growth and raised living standards."

In the 2000s, publication of accounts and evaluations of the Cultural Revolution from the perspective of victims became increasingly proscribed. During general secretaryship of Xi Jinping, independent evaluation and open discussion of the Cultural Revolution in China has been censored in both academia and online.

=== Religion ===
In 1981, The Basic Viewpoint and Policy on the Religious Question during Our Country's Socialist Period (commonly known as Document No. 19) revised the CCP's stance on religion and identified some specific policies and regulations. Document No. 19 states that attempts to eliminate religion through coercion are counterproductive. It particularly criticized the Gang of Four's measures against religious adherents during the Cultural Revolution, and which forced some religious currents underground.

== Public views in mainland China ==
=== The New Enlightenment movement ===
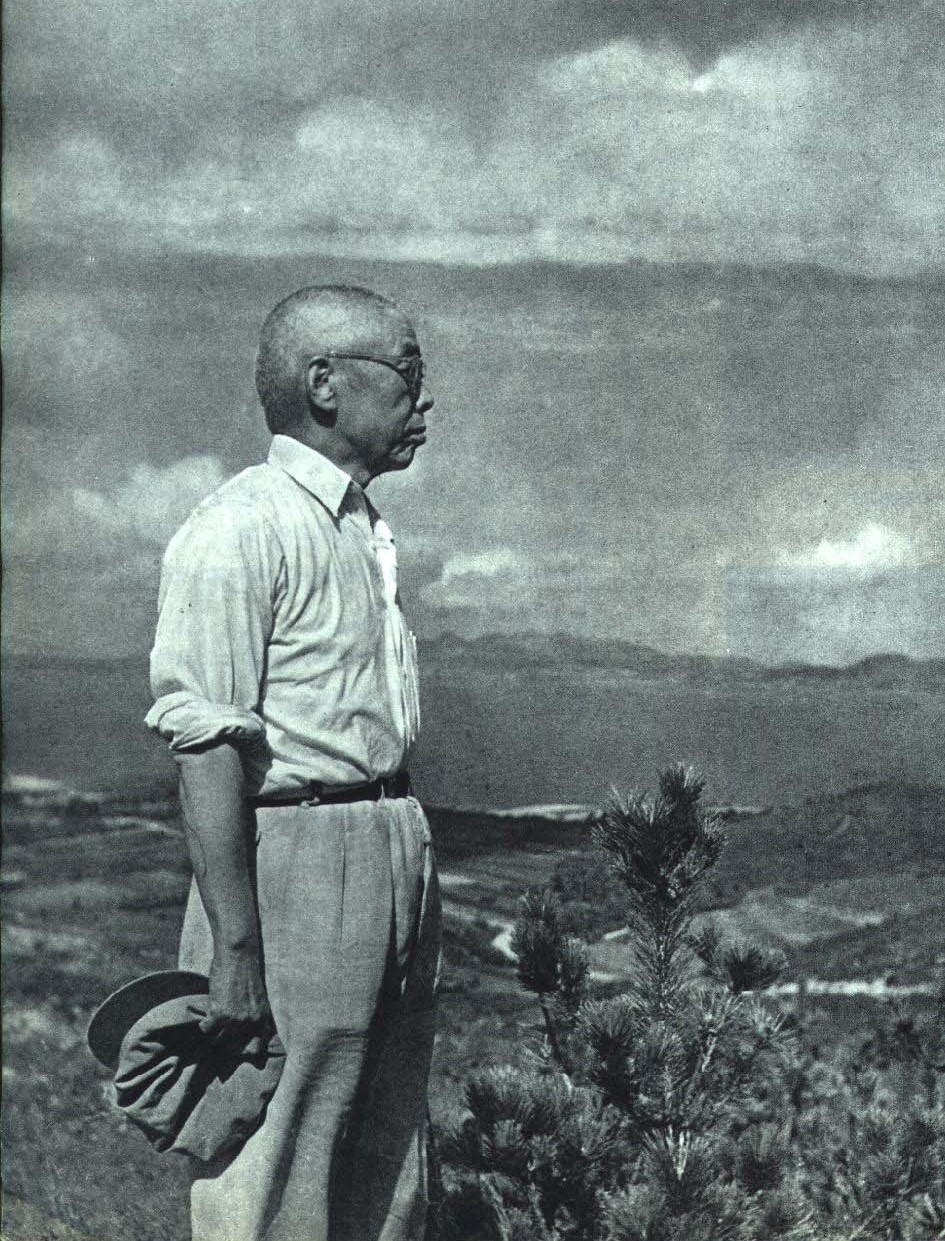
Tian Han, the lyrics author of Chinese national anthem "March of the Volunteers", was persecuted to death during the Cultural Revolution, and as a result there was a ban on singing the lyrics of the national anthem during this period.

After the Cultural Revolution, a massive social and cultural movement known as the "New Enlightenment" took place in mainland China since the late 1970s. Growing out of the "1978 Truth Criterion Discussion" during the Boluan Fanzheng period, the movement was led by intellectuals and opposed the ideology of Cultural Revolution and feudalism. The New Enlightenment movement called for the revival of "democracy and science", which was the old theme of the May Fourth Movement in 1919, and promoted humanism and universal values within the Chinese society. A number of new literature genres such as the scar literature and the misty poetry emerged which focused on the reflection of the Cultural Revolution. Ba Jin, a notable Chinese writer, further called on the Chinese society to establish Cultural Revolution museums:

"Let history not be repeated" must not be an empty phrase. In order that everyone sees clearly and remembers clearly, it is necessary to build a museum of the "Cultural Revolution," exhibiting concrete and real objects, and reconstructing striking scenes which will testify to what took place on this Chinese soil twenty years ago! Everyone will recall the march of events there, and each will recall his or her behavior during that decade.

The New Enlightenment movement ended due to the Tiananmen Square massacre in June 1989. After Deng Xiaoping's southern tour in early 1992, however, intellectuals in mainland China became divided and formed two major schools of thought, the Liberalism and the New Left, which held different views on the Cultural Revolution.

The Liberalism school argued that China should continue its reform and opening, further developing market economy while pushing forward political reforms for human rights, freedom, democracy, rule of law and constitutionalism. On the other hand, the New Left argued that capitalism had become prevalent in mainland China, and therefore they criticize market mechanism and call for social justice and equality, defending some of Mao's policies during the Cultural Revolution.

=== Maoist view ===
Meanwhile, Maoist scholars held another view. Gao Mobo argued that, although the Chinese Communist Party officially condemns the Cultural Revolution, many Chinese people hold more positive views, particularly amongst the working class, who benefited most from its policies. People in rural areas tend to view the Cultural Revolution more positively given the expansion of rural infrastructure and agricultural development that occurred. During Deng's ascendancy, the government arrested and imprisoned figures who took a strongly pro-Cultural Revolution stance. For instance, in 1985, a young shoe-factory worker put up a poster at a factory in Xianyang, Shaanxi, which declared that "The Cultural Revolution was Good" and led to achievements such as "the building of the Nanjing Yangtze River Bridge, the creation of hybrid rice crops and the rise of people's consciousness." The worker was eventually sentenced to ten years in prison, where he died soon after "without any apparent cause".

Some argued that, since the late 1980s, China has experienced "at first a fitful and then a nationwide revival in Mao Zedong", including aspects of the Cultural Revolution. Maoist hold that the Cultural Revolution "cleansed" China from superstitions, religious dogma, and outdated traditions in a "modernist transformation" that later made Deng's economic reforms possible. The popular revival of Mao in the late 1990s coincided with the government's increasing privatization and its dismantling of its iron rice bowl employment and welfare policies. These sentiments also increased following the US bombing of the Chinese embassy in Belgrade in 1999 when a segment of the population began to associate anti-Mao viewpoints with the US.

Contemporary Maoists became more organized in the internet era. One Maoist website collected thousands of signatures demanding punishment for those who publicly criticize Mao. Along with the call for legal action, this movement demanded the establishment of agencies similar to Cultural Revolution-era "neighborhood committees", in which "citizens" would report anti-Maoists to local public security bureaus. Maoist rhetoric and mass mobilization methods were resurgent in Chongqing during the 2000s.

=== Survey data ===
In 2012, Chinese web portal and social media platform Tencent conducted an online survey focused on combatting "the unhealthy trend of Cultural Revolution nostalgia." Seventy-eight percent of survey participants expressed Cultural Revolution nostalgia.

A 2022 survey by Fenghuang.com's history channel found that 58% of respondents support the Cultural Revolution while 42% oppose it.

=== Nostalgia and commercialization ===
After decreasing in prominence throughout the 1980s, Cultural Revolution posters became prominent in public life again in the 1990s in connection with red tourism, as collectibles, in commercial advertising, and in contemporary art. In contemporary China, they continue to be reproduced in large amounts and sold commercially. Historic posters have been the subject of exhibitions and auctions, including in the United States and Europe.

In the early 2000s, Cultural Revolution-themed restaurants opened in China. Some of them, such as The Red Classics Restaurant in the Beijing suburbs, had a significant level of success.

Nostalgia for cultural products of the period is widespread.

== Outside mainland China ==
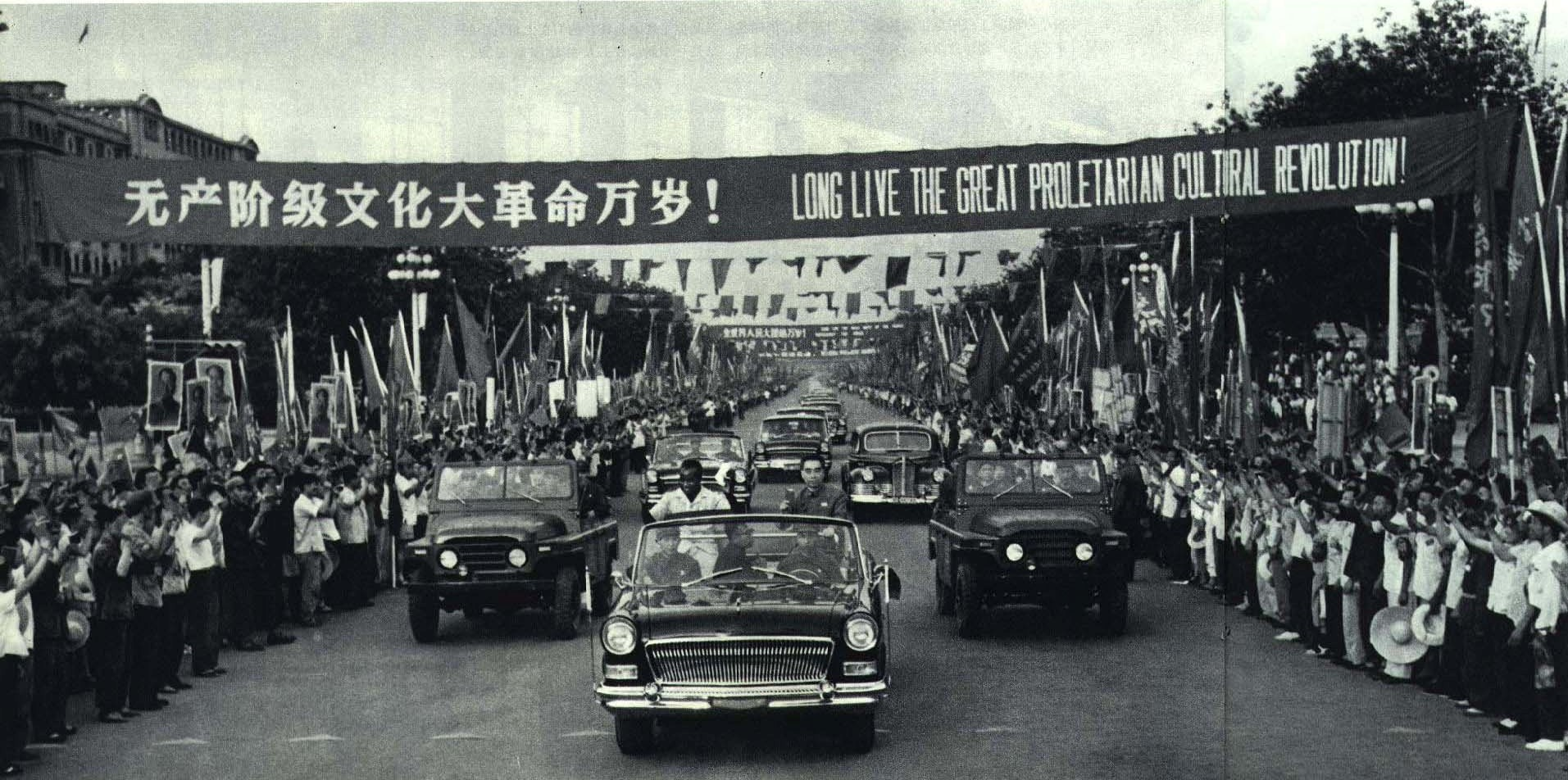
Kenneth Kaunda, the first president of Zambia, visited China during the Cultural Revolution (1967).

In the world at large, Mao Zedong emerged as a symbol of anti-establishment, grassroots populism, and self-determination. His revolutionary philosophies found adherents in the Shining Path of Peru, the Naxalite insurgency in India, various political movements in Nepal, and the United States–based Black Panther Party.

In Hong Kong, the 1967 riots were inspired by the Cultural Revolution. Its excesses damaged the credibility of these activists in the eyes of Hong Kong residents. In Taiwan, Chiang Kai-shek initiated the Chinese Cultural Renaissance to counter what he regarded as the destruction of traditional Chinese values by the CCP.

In Albania, Communist leader and Chinese ally Enver Hoxha began a "Cultural and Ideological Revolution" organized along the same lines as the Cultural Revolution. Hoxha delivered a speech to a plenum of the CC of the Party of Labour titled Some Preliminary Ideas about the Cultural Revolution, criticizing it. He said that "the cult of Mao was raised to the skies in a sickening and artificial manner" and added that, in reading its purported objectives, "you have the impression that everything old in Chinese and world culture should be rejected without discrimination and a new culture, the culture they call proletarian, should be created." He further stated that, "It is difficult for us to call this revolution, as the 'Red Guards' are carrying it out, a Proletarian Cultural Revolution... the enemies could and should be captured by the organs of the dictatorship on the basis of the law, and if the enemies have wormed their way into the party committees, let them be purged through party channels. Or in the final analysis, arm the working class and attack the committees, but not with children."

In October 1966, Chiang Kai-Shek criticized the Cultural Revolution as a synonym for Mao Zedong's method in the name of proletarian revolution after failures of Proletarian Revolution General Route, Great Leap Forward, People's commune and the Three Red Flags. He claimed that Maoism lost its origins in Marxism–Leninism. And Mao himself dropped his Marxist–Leninist mask, revealing its roots in Huang Chao, Li Zicheng, roving gang, and the Boxer Rebellion, destroying Chinese Culture, purging intellectuals, destroying modern civilization, and used his "people's war" to attempt to rule Asia and the world following Adolf Hitler's actions.

In the 1970s, Nikita Khrushchev criticized the Cultural Revolution in his memoir. He saw Chinese people repeatedly recite Mao's quotations and felt sick after he saw human dignity trampled. He argued that Mao is not supernatural, but upended his country, and that the Cultural Revolution was actually counter-revolutionary.

In 2007, Hong Kong Chief Executive Donald Tsang remarked that the Cultural Revolution represented the 'dangers of democracy', remarking "People can go to the extreme like what we saw during the Cultural Revolution [...], when people take everything into their own hands, then you cannot govern the place." The remarks caused controversy in Hong Kong and were later retracted.
