= Deng Xiaoping's southern tour =

1992 political campaign in southern China

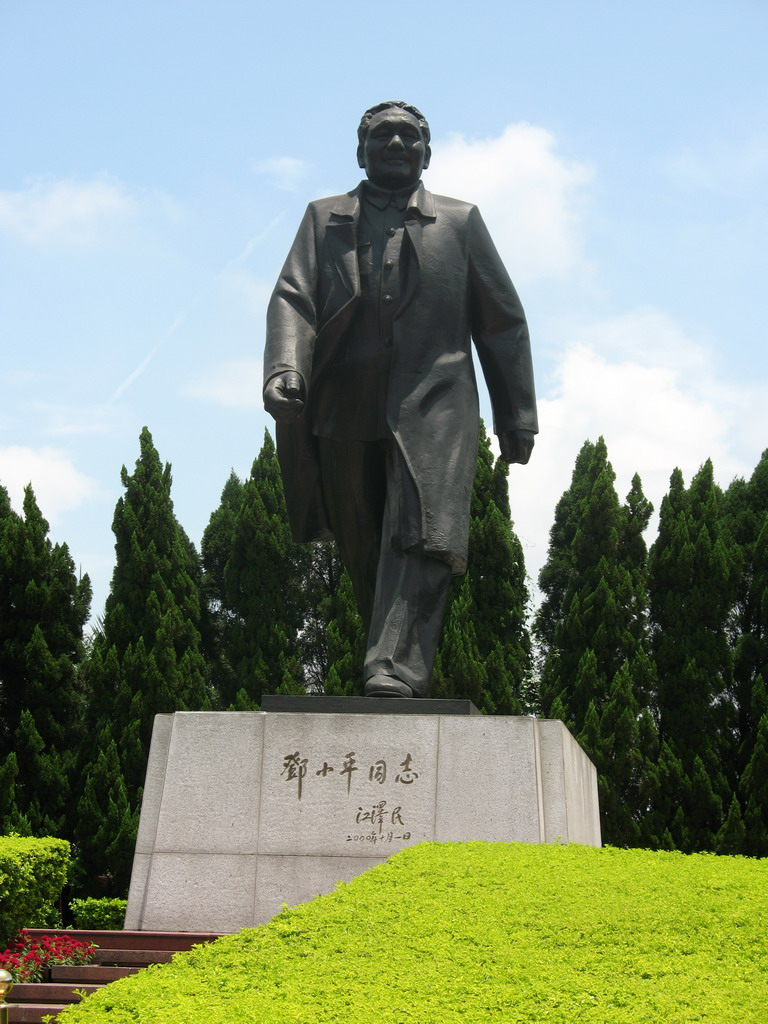
- The statue of Deng Xiaoping on top of the Lianhuashan Park in Shenzhen, China
- Simplified Chinese: 邓小平南巡
- Traditional Chinese: 鄧小平南巡
Transcriptions
Standard Mandarin
- Hanyu Pinyin: Dèng Xiǎopíng Nán Xún
Yue: Cantonese
- Jyutping: dang6 siu2 ping4 naam4 ceon4

1992 southern tour
- Chinese: 九二南巡
- Literal meaning: 92 South Tour
Transcriptions
Standard Mandarin
- Hanyu Pinyin: Jiǔ Èr Nán Xún
Yue: Cantonese
- Jyutping: gau2 ji6 naam4 ceon4

Deng Xiaoping's southern tour (Chinese: 邓小平南巡), or 1992 southern tour (九二南巡), or simply Nanxun (南巡) was the tour of Deng Xiaoping, the third paramount leader of China, in southern China, including in Shenzhen, Zhuhai, Guangzhou and Shanghai, from 18 January to 21 February 1992. The talks and remarks made by Deng during the tour resumed and reinforced the implementation of his reform and opening up program in mainland China, which had come to a halt after the military crackdown on 1989 Tiananmen Square protests ordered by Deng himself.

At the time of the tour, Deng held no formal position in the Party or the government, having resigned as Chairman of the Central Military Commission in November 1989. However, he still held soft powers in the Party as an active and influential political figure. The dissolution of the Soviet Union in December 1991 had further strengthened conservative leaders within the CCP, such as Chen Yun, who argued that market-oriented reforms risked destabilizing Communist Party rule in the same way that liberalization had contributed to the Soviet collapse. This political environment forced Deng to build support for his reform agenda outside of Beijing, relying on local provincial allies and sympathetic military figures rather than working through the central party apparatus. After Tiananmen Square incident, there was a lack of belief in the Chinese Communist Party both at home and abroad. The United States and European Union both issued arms embargoes while the World Bank and Asian Development Bank stopped issuing loans to China. The 1992 Southern Tour is widely regarded as a critical point in the modern history of China, as it saved the reform and opening up as well as the capital market, and preserved societal stability. It not only preserved stability inside of China, but it was reassuring to foreign countries who had begun to invest large amounts of money into China.

During the southern tour, Deng emphasized to several military leaders of the People's Liberation Army, including Yang Shangkun, Liu Huaqing and Yang Baibing, that "those who do not promote reform should be brought down from their leadership positions", forcing Jiang Zemin, then General Secretary of the Chinese Communist Party (CCP), to support and continue the reform and opening up program. He also wished that Guangdong province would catch up with the Four Asian Tigers in terms of economic development within 20 years. Some of the notable remarks and comments from Deng during the tour included "I don't care if the cat is black or white, so long as it catches mice" (cat theory), which was originally published by him in the 1960s, and "development is of overriding importance (发展才是硬道理)" as well as "[the Shenzhen government] should be bolder in carrying out the Reforms and Opening-up, dare to make experiments and should not act as women with bound feet".

However, although Deng himself mentioned that anti-corruption must be imposed throughout the entire reform and opening up process and emphasized the importance of rule of law, the Southern Tour did not resolve the corruption issue as well as the widening economic inequality in China, nor did it resume China's political reforms: "Scholars have noted that the development model accelerated by the Southern Tour widened the gap between China's prosperous coastal regions and its underdeveloped interior, a disparity that persists today. The tour's legacy is therefore mixed: while it produced remarkable GDP growth, it also entrenched structural inequalities that the CCP has struggled to address in subsequent decades."

== Historical background ==
The aftermath of the 1989 Tiananmen Square protests had created a conservative backlash within the Chinese Communist Party, significantly slowing down the reform and opening up. Globally, the breakup of the Soviet Union and the rise of neoliberalism intensified debates over the sustainability of market-oriented policies, with some questioning the East Asian model. Facing opposition from party conservatives who feared these policies might weaken socialist principles, Deng launched the Southern Tour to reaffirm his commitment to reforms and steer China's economic trajectory. Beginning in late 1988, the economic reforms favored by Deng were increasingly resisted by other Chinese leaders.

=== Halt of reform and opening up ===
Members of the Central Committee of the Chinese Communist Party (CCP) showed serious disagreements over whether the reform and opening up should continue after Deng Xiaoping ordered the military crackdown on 1989 Tiananmen Square protests. After reformist leader Zhao Ziyang was forced to leave his position as the CCP General Secretary for his sympathetic stance on students' protests, Jiang Zemin was appointed the succeeding General Secretary with the support from several powerful left-wing conservatives leaders (also known as hardliners) including Chen Yun and Li Xiannian.

In November 1989, the CCP Central Committee passed a resolution ("关于进一步治理整顿和深化改革的决定") stating that the pace of reforms was too fast, and decided to overhaul the changes. There were fears and concerns within the CCP that further reforms may turn China into a capitalist country. As a result, the reform and opening up program came to a virtual halt, especially after the Revolutions of 1989 in Europe and around the time of the dissolution of the Soviet Union in 1991, and the CCP shifted its focus to preventing the "Peaceful Evolution" from the West. Deng Xiaoping, on the other hand, saw the dissolution of the Soviet Union as more of a reason to open.

=== Media debate ===
Starting from the spring of 1991, Shanghai-based newspaper Liberation Daily published a series of articles under the author name of "Huangfu Ping (皇甫平)", promoting further economic reforms, which quickly gained support amongst local officials and populace. On the other hand, several Beijing-based media outlets including Qiushi and Guangming Daily, which were under the control of Jiang Zemin and Li Peng (then Premier of China), responded by directly criticizing Huangfu's articles on Liberation Daily, questioning whether China was following a capitalist path or a socialist path.

== The tour ==
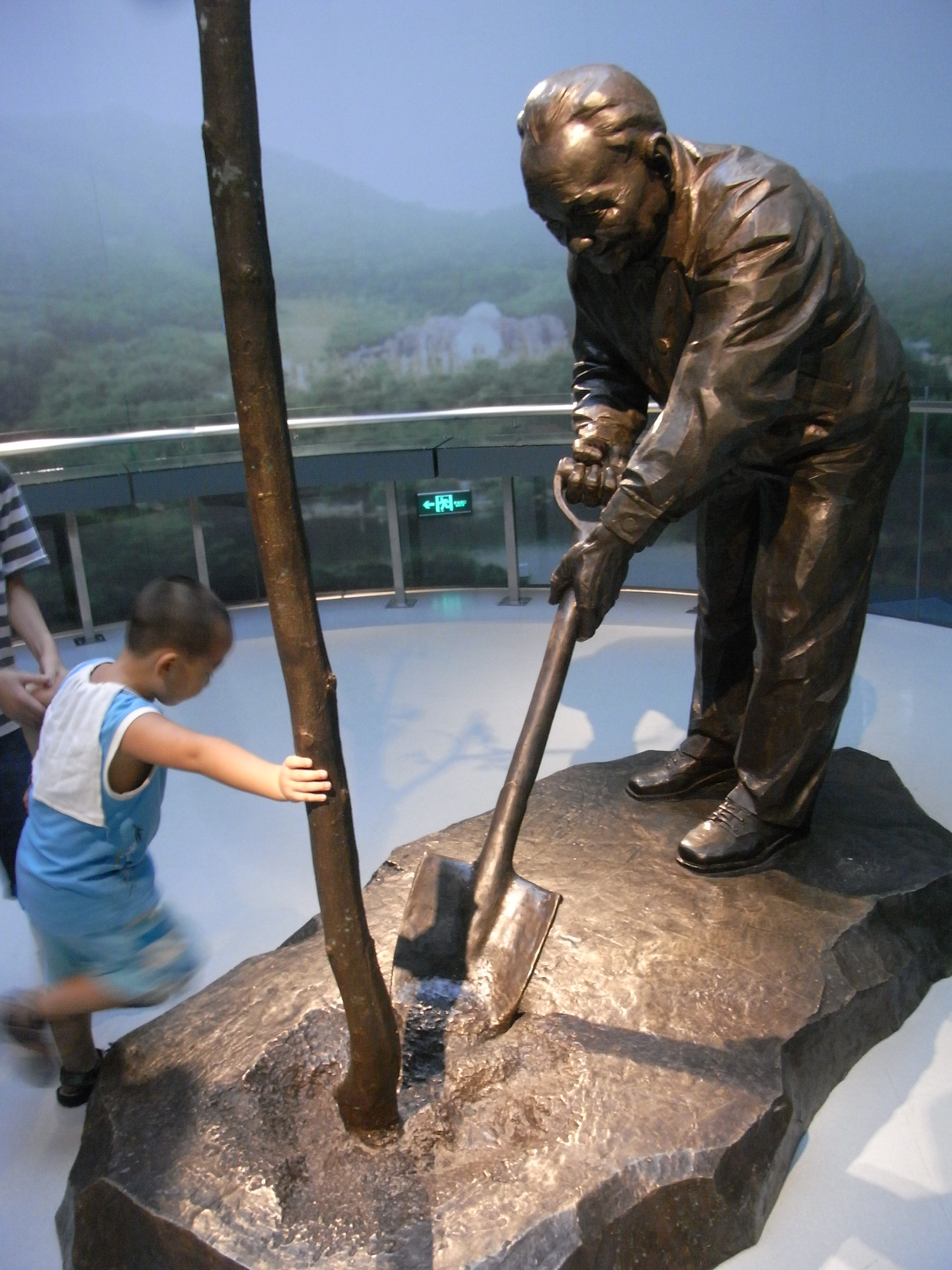
A statue of Deng Xiaoping planting a tree at the Fairy Lake Botanical Garden in Shenzhen during the tour

At the age of 87, Deng Xiaoping began his southern tour on 18 January 1992 when he visited the Wuchang District of Wuhan in Hubei Province as well as Changsha in Hunan Province. He then visited several cities in Guangdong Province, including Shenzhen, Zhuhai and Guangzhou from 19 to 29 January. After that, he briefly stayed in Jiangxi Province, and on 31 January Deng arrived in Shanghai, the last stop of his southern tour. After spending the 1992 Chinese New Year in Shanghai, Deng briefly visited Nanjing in Jiangsu Province as well as Anhui Province on his way back to Beijing on 20 February.

Family members from three generations of Deng's family traveled with him on the southern tour, including four of his five children, his wife Zhuo Lin, and several grandchildren. The most publicly prominent of his family members on the tour was Deng Rong. Deng Xiaoping's longtime secretary Wang Ruilin also accompanied him on the tour.

=== Media coverage ===
Initially, Deng's southern tour was ignored by Beijing and China's national media, which were then under the control of Deng's political rivals. Jiang Zemin, then General Secretary of the Chinese Communist Party since 1989, showed little support. Many mainland news sources didn't publish anything about Deng's trip, and it was reporters from Hong Kong who first made reports on the trip. Media in Hong Kong first reported Deng's tour after receiving confirmation from Shenzhen government, while Shenzhen Special Zone Daily later gave a detailed report on Deng's southern tour in an article on 26 March 1992, without receiving approval from the China's central government, making it the first media in mainland China to do so. The author of the article, local journalist Chen Xitian, had been the only print media reporter permitted to join Deng and his party during the visit to Shenzhen.

The first public record from Deng's tour was a photograph of him during his 21 January visit to the China Folk Culture Village which was taken by Malaysian Chinese tourists and published 22 January by a Hong Kong newspaper.

Eventually, Deng Xiaoping won against the left-wing conservatives, and under enormous pressure from the military, Jiang Zemin and others changed their stance and gave in to Deng. As part of Deng's Southern Tour, the results of market reforms were broadcast widely on television.

=== Wuhan ===
Wuhan was Deng's first stop. On January 17th, Deng Xiaoping, Deng Nan, and others departed from Beijing on a train with no news reporters or passengers; however, three cameramen from the Central Newsreel and Documentary Film Studio were present. At 10:31am on January 18th, Deng Xiaoping’s train arrived at Wuchang Railway Station and was greeted by Guan Guangfu (CCP Committee Secretary of Hubei), Guo Shuyan (Governor of Hubei Province), and Qian Yunlu (CCP Chief of Heilongjiang and Guizhou; Governor of Guizhou Province). After conversing, Deng Xiaoping re-boards his train for his next stop: Shenzhen. After Deng Xiaoping’s departure, Guan Guangfu, Guo Shuyan, and Qian Yunlu converse and record Deng Xiaoping’s notable remarks from their earlier conversation.His remarks were summarized in four key ideas. 1) China can only be saved through the means of reform and opening up. 2) Development is the absolute principle; one should not get bogged down in debates over socialism versus capitalism. 3) Economic development must be maintained at a certain pace. 4) Leftist ideology exerts a pernicious influence; anyone who fails to implement reform must step down.

=== Changsha ===
On January 18, at 4 PM, Deng Xiaoping’s train arrived at the Changsha Railway Station and was stopped for a brief 10 minutes. During this short stop, Deng Xiaoping was greeted by Xiong Qingquan (CCP Committee Secretary; Governor of Hunan Province) and was delivered a report on the situation in Changsha over the past year. During this brief stop, Deng Xiaoping expressed concerns to Xiong about the slow pace of economic development and warned against over-caution in reform efforts.

=== Shenzhen ===
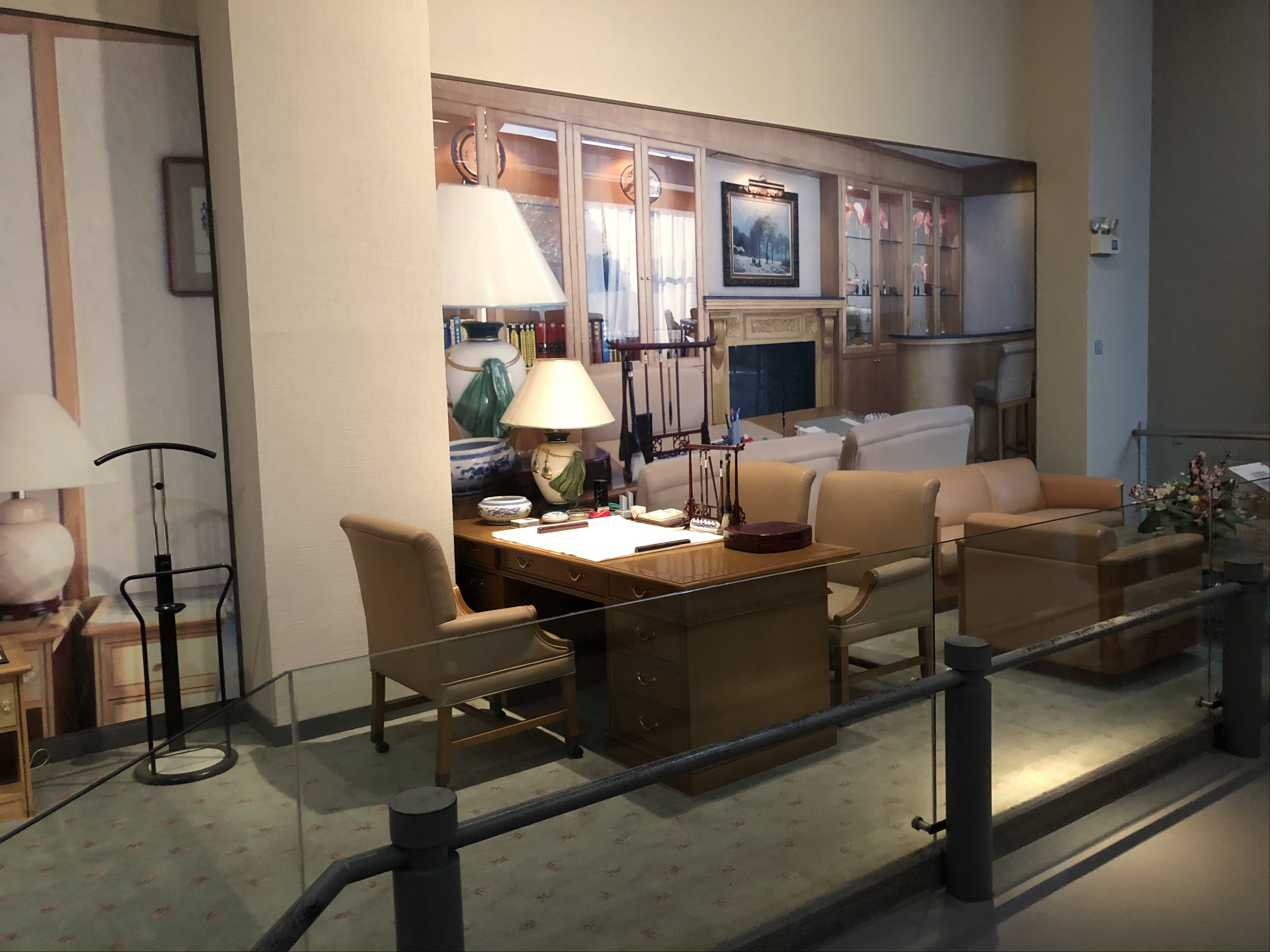
The hotel room in which Deng Xiaoping stayed while visiting Shenzhen

Around 9 am on 19 January 1992, Deng Xiaoping arrived in Shenzhen, one of China's first special economic zones (SEZs) approved by himself, and was warmly received by local officials including Xie Fei, the Communist Party Secretary of Guangdong Province. Deng's visit to Shenzhen highlighted it both for its rhetorical power and practical example in support of Deng's favored economic policies.

In his discussions with party officials about SEZs, Deng stated that while there had been differing opinions on the operations of SEZs and whether they were capitalist, Shenzhen's development illustrated that they were consistent with socialism. Deng stated that those who viewed SEZs as part of a movement towards capitalism "lacked basic knowledge". In Deng's view, Shenzhen should welcome additional foreign investment.

Deng visited the Guomao Building. The next day, he visited the high-profile factory of Xianke Laser Company (SAST), a state-owned enterprise that produced laser discs, CD players, and speakers. It was chosen because it was the kind of high tech industry Deng sought to develop in Shenzhen and elsewhere. On 21 January, he visited the Overseas Chinese Town and the Splendid China Folk Village. In the morning of 22 January, Deng visited the Fairy Lake Botanical Garden together with his wife, children and grandchildren, planting a tree there; in the afternoon, Deng delivered his famous lines to the officials of the Shenzhen government:

"[The Shenzhen government] should be bolder in carrying out the Reforms and Opening-up, dare to make experiments and should not act as women with bound feet. If you think something is right, then bravely test it and embrace it. The important experience of Shenzhen is the daring spirit. Without this daring spirit and the courage, without the energy, you can not find a good path or a new path, and you can not create a new career. (改革开放胆子要大一些，敢于试验，不能像小脚女人一样。看准了的，就大胆地试，大胆地闯。深圳的重要经验就是敢闯。没有一点闯的精神，没有一点“冒”的精神，没有一股气呀、劲呀，就走不出一条好路，走不出一条新路，就干不出新的事业)

During the visit, Deng wished that Guangdong Province would catch up with the Four Asian Tigers in terms of economic development within 20 years. Deng's visit also saved China's capital market, especially the two newly established stock exchanges: the Shanghai Stock Exchange (since November 1990) and the Shenzhen Stock Exchange (since December 1990). Deng pointed out that:

It'll take careful study to determine whether stocks and the stock market are good for socialism or not, or whether they only belong to capitalism. This also means that we must first try it out! (证券、股票，这些东西究竟好不好，有没有危险，是不是资本市场独有的东西，社会主义能不能用?允许看，但要坚决地试)

=== Zhuhai ===
On 23 January, Deng set off for Zhuhai, another special economic zone in Guangdong Province. In Zhuhai, Deng emphasized to several military leaders of the People's Liberation Army including Yang Shangkun, Liu Huaqing and Yang Baibing, that "those who do not promote reform should be brought down from their leadership positions". Because it was held without the knowledge of Jiang Zemin, who had nominally succeeded Deng as the chairman of the Central Military Commission, the Zhuhai Conference was considered a quasi-coup d'état, and the military subsequently declared its determination to safeguard (baojia huhang 保驾护航) Deng's reforms, implying that it would replace the Jiang leadership with a reformist one if necessary.

He also paid visits to several high-tech companies in Zhuhai, where he underlined the importance of science and technology and called on Chinese overseas students to come back to their motherland. Deng left the area on 29 January.

=== Shanghai ===
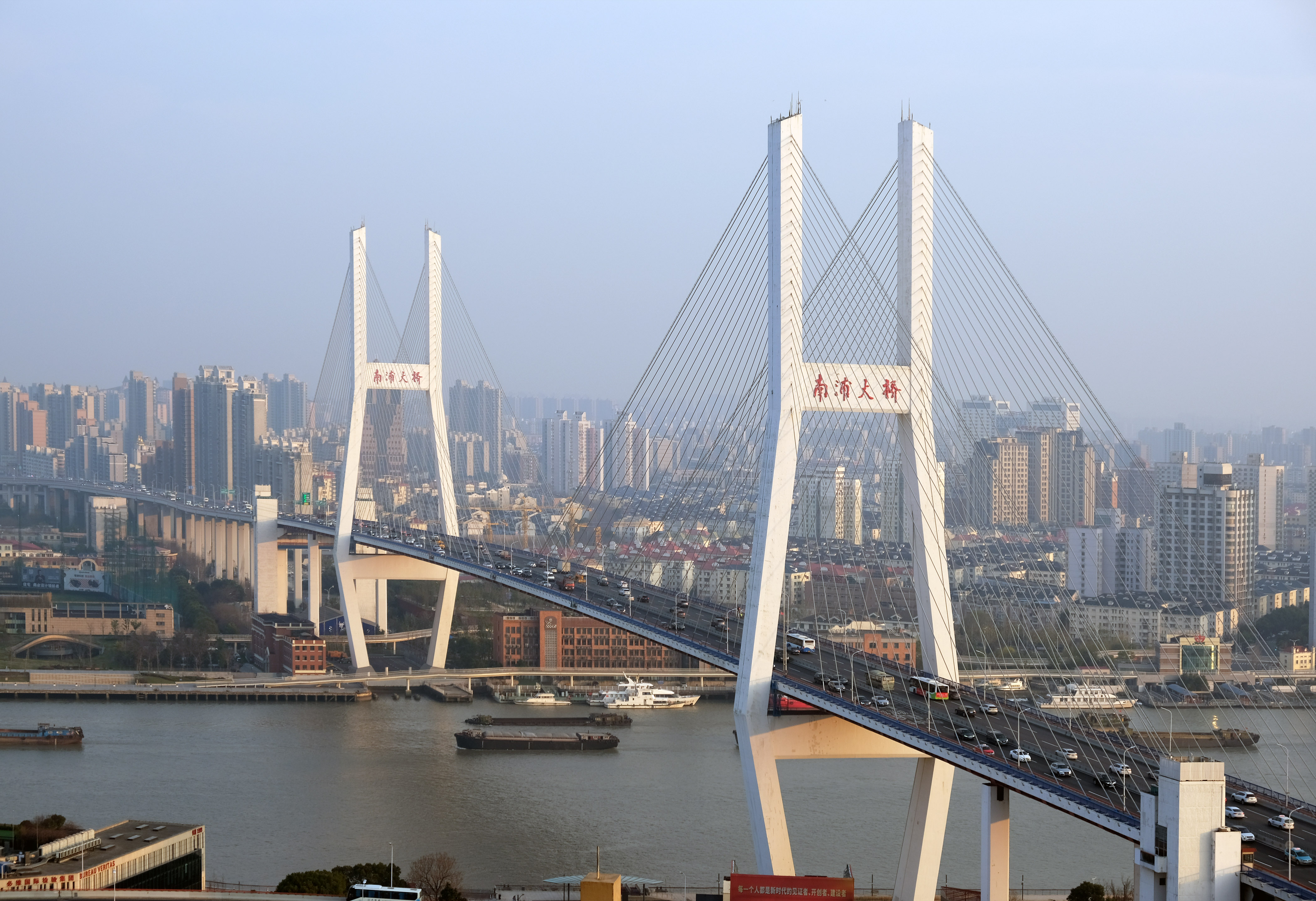
Deng visited the Nanpu Bridge of Shanghai on 7 February 1992.

On 31 January, Deng arrived in Shanghai, where he celebrated the 1992 Chinese New Year.

In Shanghai, Deng visited the Nanpu Bridge on 7 February, and on the next day he toured the Huangpu River on a cruise ship, accompanied by local officials including Huang Ju and Wu Bangguo. Together with Yang Shangkun and others, Deng visited several high-tech companies in Shanghai beginning 10 February. On 18 February, he spent his night of the Lantern Festival in the shopping district of Nanjing Road.

On February 12th, Deng Xiaoping visited the Minhang Development Zone and Qizhong Village in Maqiao Town. On the 18th, the day of the Lantern Festival, Deng Xiaoping visited the No. 1 Department Store, where he purchased pencils and erasers for his grandson, earning himself warm welcomes and crowds from the public.

Deng left Shanghai for Beijing on 23 February, completing his southern tour. He was instrumental in the development of Shanghai's Pudong New Area, revitalizing the city as one of China's economic hubs.

== Notable remarks ==
On his tour, Deng made various speeches which generated large local support for his reformist platform. He stressed the importance of economic reform in China, and criticized those who were against further reform and opening up. Although there was a debate on whether or not Deng actually said it, his perceived catchphrase, "to get rich is glorious" unleashed a wave of personal entrepreneurship that continues to drive China's economy today. The aphorism is likely a misquotation of his statement, "Let some areas and some people get rich first, to spur and assist other areas and other people, and gradually achieve common prosperity".

Deng also stated that the "leftist" elements of the CCP were much more dangerous than "rightist" ones.

In one of the most consequential speeches addressing Reform and Opening Up, Deng stated:

The essential difference between socialism and capitalism is not whether state planning dominates the market or vice versa. The planned economy is not equivalent to socialism, and in a capitalist economy, there is also planning. Both planning and markets are means of economics ... Are securities and the stock market good or bad? Could socialism also use them? We are allowed to take a look, but more importantly, we should try it out ... For socialism to gain an advantage it must bravely absorb and learn from all the achievements of civilizations created by human society.

Speaking during the tour, Deng Xiaoping characterized the Cultural Revolution as civil war, and attributed the maintenance of stability after the 1989 Tiananmen Square protests and massacre to the economic growth and raised living standards during Reform and Opening Up.

Other notable remarks from Deng during his southern tour included:

- Cat theory: "I don't care if the cat is black or white, so long as it catches mice (不管黑猫白猫，捉到老鼠就是好猫)", which was originally published by Deng in the 1960s but became widely known after the tour.
- "Planned economy does not equal socialism and market economy does not equal capitalism. Socialism can have market mechanisms as well, and government planning and market are both economic means."
- "Development is of overriding importance (发展才是硬道理)”
- "[The Shenzhen government] should be bolder in carrying out the Reforms and Opening-up, dare to make experiments and should not act as women with bound feet (改革开放胆子要大一些，敢于试验，不能像小脚女人一样)"
- "Those who do not promote reform should be brought down from their leadership positions (谁不改革，谁就下台)"
- "We should do more and engage less in empty talk (多干实事，少说空话)"
- "Go to learn from abroad, especially from Singapore. They have a system and governance on how to manage the society."

== Effects ==
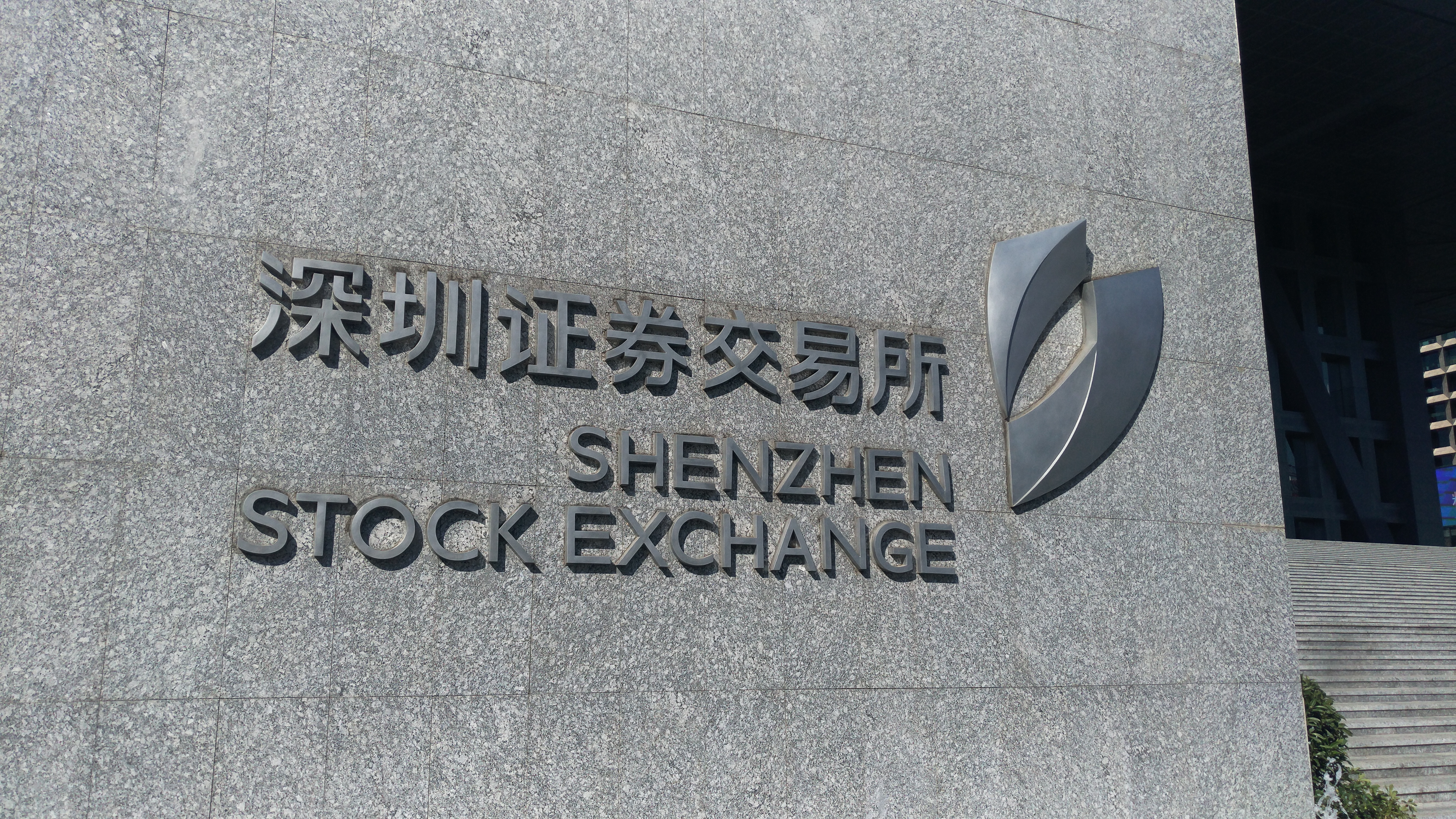
Shenzhen Stock Exchange

Deng's new wave of policy rhetoric gave way to a new political storm between factions in the Politburo of the Chinese Communist Party. Jiang eventually sided with Deng in April 1992, and the national media finally reported Deng's southern tour almost two months after it completed. Observers suggest that Jiang's submission to Deng's policies had solidified his position as Deng's heir apparent. Behind the scenes, Deng's southern tour aided his reformist allies' such as Shanghai party committee secretary Zhu Rongji climb to the apex of national power, and permanently changed China's direction toward economic development. Deng increased his support among province leaders, the military, the press, and the public generally. According to journalist Jonathan Chatwin, the southern tour was effective not because there was consensus at the top levels of the Party, but because news of his speeches empowered local officials to express their support for these ideas to central authorities. In addition, the eventual outcome of the southern tour proved that Deng was still the most powerful man in China.

During his Southern Tour, Deng's visits to cities like Shenzhen, Zhuhai, and Shanghai underscored the success of Special Economic Zones as symbols of China's reform and opening-up policies. In his remarks, Deng emphasized prioritizing economic growth over rigid ideological partisanship, declaring, “Development is the only hard truth.” However, party conservatives criticized this approach as a betrayal of socialism, warning of risks such as inequality and corruption. These contrasting views reveal a complex reception, where Deng's vision inspired hope among reformists while fueling skepticism among traditionalists. Deng's southern tour saved China's capital market and protected the two stock exchanges in China: the Shanghai Stock Exchange (since November 1990) and the Shenzhen Stock Exchange (since December 1990). Moreover, his insistence on economic openness aided in the phenomenal growth levels of the coastal areas, especially the "Golden Triangle" region surrounding Shanghai. Deng reiterated the general policy that 'some areas must get rich before others', and asserted that the wealth from coastal regions will eventually be transferred to aid economic construction inland. The theory, however, faced numerous challenges when put into practice, as provincial governments moved to protect their own interests. Although private elements of the economy had existed since 1978, these forms of private ownership were first legally acknowledged during the southern tour. In the years immediately following the tour, economic growth was rapid. Growth was approximately 13% in both 1992 and in 1993. Investment in coastal areas of China greatly increased, and foreign direct investment in China as a whole reached US$25 billion in 1993.

After Deng Xiaoping's 1992 southern tour, the culture industry of China became increasingly commercialized.

== See also ==
- Shenzhen speed
- Time is Money, Efficiency is Life
- Story of Spring
- Socialist market economy
- 8th Five-Year Plan (China)
