= Crossing the river by touching the stones =

Chinese aphorism

- Simplified Chinese: 摸着石头过河
- Traditional Chinese: 摸著石頭過河
Transcriptions
Standard Mandarin
- Hanyu Pinyin: Mōzhe shítouguò hé

Crossing the river by touching the stones (simplified Chinese: 摸着石头过河; traditional Chinese: 摸著石頭過河), or crossing the river by feeling the stones, touching the stone to cross the river, is originally a Chinese-language idiom and folk saying, complete with two expressions, crossing the river by touching the stones - step steadily, then take a step; crossing the river by touching the stones - seeking stability. It is borrowed to denote a scientific method of work, indicating a steady attitude of exploration in the face of new things.

== Origin ==
"Crossing the river by touching the stones" is a slogan initially put forward by Chen Yun, one of the leaders of the Chinese Communist Party. It was originally coined at the administrative meeting of the State Council of the Central People's Government on April 7, 1950, where Chen Yun pointed out: price rise was not good, fall was also bad for production. We should "cross the river by touching the stones", it was better to be stable.

Although Chen first proposed the phrase, it has always been associated with Deng Xiaoping, who is known for his adherence to the reform philosophy of "crossing the river by touching the stones".

== Definition ==
Crossing the river by touching the stones means "to take one step and look around before taking another". It is a programmatic attitude toward China's reform and opening up. China's leaders often cite this popular metaphor to describe the path they have followed in economic reform. The idea is similar to risk tradeoff analysis or "risk risk" (how reducing some risks can increase others), with added emphasis on the importance of past experience.

== Methods ==
The methods of "crossing the river by feeling the stones" include allowing farmers to grow and sell their own crops while maintaining state ownership of the land; removing investment restrictions in "special economic zones" but retaining them in other parts of China; or introducing privatization by initially selling only minority stakes in state-owned enterprises.

== See also ==
- Cat theory
- Lester Lave
- Risk management
