= Cat theory (Deng Xiaoping) =

Chinese philosophy of pragmatic economics

Deng Xiaoping's cat theory (simplified Chinese: 猫论; traditional Chinese: 貓論) is an economic philosophy which states, "it doesn't matter if a cat is black or white, if it catches mice it's a good cat." (不管黑猫白猫，能捉到老鼠就是好猫).

Deng argued that a planned economy or a market economy is only a tool for distributing resources and has nothing to do with political institutions. In other words, socialism can have a market economy, and capitalism can have a planned economy. The cat theory gained widespread recognition within Chinese society after Deng Xiaoping's southern tour in 1992 and became an underlying ideology of China's reform and opening up.

== History ==
=== Initial proposal ===
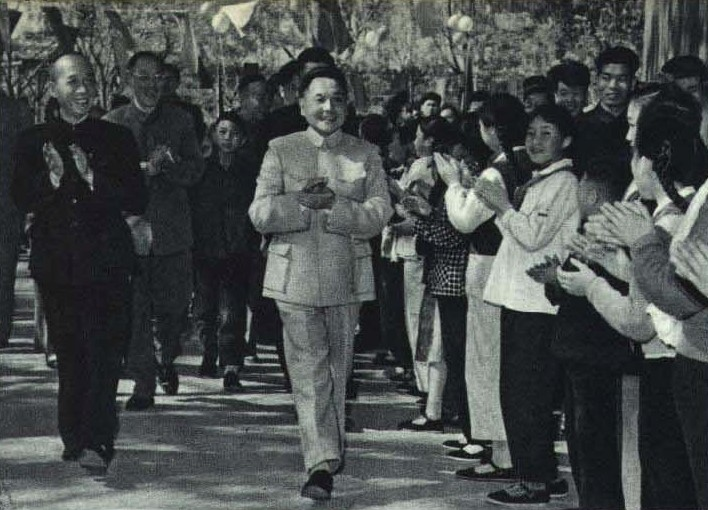
Deng Xiaoping in Beijing (1963)

In 1962, Deng Xiaoping, then vice premier of China, quoted a Chinese proverb, "it doesn't matter if a cat is black or yellow, as long as it catches mice" as an endorsement for the economic reform policy "sanzi yibao (三自一包, 'Three selfs, one contract', referring to household plots, rural free markets, self-financing and fixed output quota)". The economic reform was initiated after the disastrous Great Leap Forward, which led to the Great Chinese Famine. On 7 July 1962, Deng elaborated further in an article "How to Recover Agricultural Production (怎样恢复农业生产)":

Comrade Liu Bocheng often quotes a proverb from Sichuan, "yellow cat or black cat, as long as it catches mice, it is a good cat". That means, the reason why we could defeat Chiang Kai-shek was that we did not follow the old rule or old pattern, but adapted to the specific scenarios. Similarly, in order to recover agricultural production now, we need to adapt to different situations instead of adhering to one fixed pattern in the relations of production. We need to use whatever method that can raise people's enthusiasm.

However, during the Cultural Revolution (1966–1976), the cat theory became one of Deng's "crimes", and he was purged twice by Mao Zedong.

The origin of the proverb itself can be traced back to the book Strange Tales from a Chinese Studio, written by Pu Songling during the Qing dynasty.

=== Revival and development ===
The cat theory was revived after Deng Xiaoping became the paramount leader of China in December 1978, when he and his allies launched the "reform and opening up" of China. After the Tiananmen Square protests in 1989, the reform and opening-up program entered a period of stagnation, and concerns arose within the Chinese Communist Party that further reforms might lead China down the path of becoming a capitalist country. In response, when visiting Shanghai in 1991, Deng stated that "reform and opening up includes taking over the useful things of capitalism." Eventually, after Deng Xiaoping's southern tour in 1992, the reform and opening-up program was resumed, and the cat theory became widely known in China and was accepted as the philosophy of economic reforms, but the "yellow cat" in the popular version of the phrase became "white cat".

== See also ==
- Deng Xiaoping Theory
- Socialism with Chinese characteristics
- Crossing the river by touching the stones
- Boluan Fanzheng
- 1978 Truth Criterion Controversy
- Seven Thousand Cadres Conference
