= To get rich is glorious =

Deng Xiaoping's slogan

"To get rich is glorious" (Chinese: 致富光荣; pinyin: Zhìfù guāngróng) is a political slogan associated with Deng Xiaoping and reform and opening up.

== Content ==
Deng Xiaoping believed that China was facing the challenge of poverty alleviation due to the feudal autocratic system and small peasant economy that had existed for 2,000 years. After the founding of the People's Republic of China, Mao Zedong's attempt to alleviate poverty was to achieve poverty alleviation and equal prosperity for the entire society through egalitarianism. However, the good wish of synchronous prosperity was not only not realized, but also led to common poverty. Another path to poverty alleviation must be sought. He said, "As far as our country is concerned, the first thing is to get rid of poverty." "How can the superiority of socialism be reflected when 80% of the country's population, farmers, cannot even guarantee food and clothing?"

Similar slogans include “It doesn’t matter whether the cat is black or white, as long as it catches mice, it is a good cat”, “development is the hard truth”, and “poverty is not socialism”.

== In popular media ==
- Tomb Sweeping (short story collection) includes a short story titled "To get rich is glorious," featuring quotes from Deng and following the narrator throughout the Reform and opening up period.
