= Gao Mobo =

Professor of Chinese studies

Gao Mobo (Chinese: 高默波; also Mobo C. F. Gao; born 1952 as Gao Changfan 高常范, Gao village, Jiangxi, China) is a Chinese-Australian professor of Chinese studies.

== Biography ==
Mobo Gao was born as the son of peasants in a village in Jiangxi that had no electricity at the time. As a child, he experienced a brief period of famine that followed the Great Leap Forward.

Gao was a barefoot doctor during the Cultural Revolution.

In 1973 Gao left the village to study English at the University of Xiamen in Fujian. In 1977 he went to Britain to study at the University of Wales and the University of Westminster in London. He graduated from the University of Essex at Colchester with a master's and doctoral degree. He specialised in Chinese language and culture and has been visiting fellow at Oxford University in Britain and at Harvard University in the United States and Visiting Professor at Qinghua University in Beijing.

In 1990, Gao emigrated to Australia and became a lecturer at the Griffith University in Brisbane. Later he became a senior lecturer at the Tasmania University. In 2008, Gao was appointed director of the Confucius Institute and professor of Chinese Studies at the University of Adelaide.

Gao frequently returns to his native village in China to visit his brother who still lives there.

== On Mao Zedong and the Cultural Revolution ==
Gao is well known for his argument that the perception of Mao Zedong and the Cultural Revolution are at times severely distorted by intellectuals and in the media of both China and the West. In The Battle for China's Past and Constructing China Gao sets out to engage with the way Mao and his policies have long been depicted in both the West and in contemporary China. The Cultural Revolution is broadly considered to represent a period of widespread violation of human rights and an unmitigated disaster. Gao argues against extreme negative depictions of Mao Zedong and China. He says that most people in China, including the rural poor and the urban working class, actually benefitted from Mao's policies of a comprehensive welfare system and basic healthcare and education provisions. Gao contends that these positive features of the Maoist period are being reversed in a contemporary capitalist China. Gao's project is to challenge and critically analyze mainstream interpretations of Maoist China and the Cultural Revolution. Gao recognizes that there is a gap between official and unofficial interpretations in the historiographical field. He observes a similar pattern in the e-media. The persistence of a large discrepancy between conflicting images and perceptions of China is Gao's subject of interpretation and understanding.

Gao writes that negative appraisals of the Mao era are often seriously misleading, he lists four ways: "First, it deprives a probable majority of the Chinese the right to speak up. Second, it hides the ugly fact that there are millions of people who are actually worse off since the post-Mao reform years. Third, it denies the enormous achievements made during the Mao era that paved the way for later development. Finally, it is misleading and it distracts from and precludes imaginings of alternative models of development and other possible forms of human organization."

=== Gao on Mao Zedong ===
==== Reacting to Mao: The Unknown Story ====
Part of Gao's scholarship is in response to the Chang and Halliday biography of Mao, Mao: The Unknown Story. Gao considers this work to represent an "intellectual scandal" for its "biased and sloppy methodology." Chang and Halliday's Mao biography is laden with anti-Mao ideological agendas meant to conform with politically correct interpretations of Mao and Maoism in the West which essentially categorize Mao with leaders such as Hitler. In his research and argumentation Gao has sought to portray Mao and what Mao represents more accurately.

Gao contrasts The Unknown Story with a known story, namely the one that the Chinese people made a social and political revolution led by the CCP, the most important leader of which was Mao. In Gao's view this revolution had objectively measured benefits for China's population. Due to this revolution the life expectancy of the majority of the Chinese rose from 35 in 1949 to 63 by 1975 in a space of less than 30 years. The revolution brought unity and stability to a country that had been racked by civil wars and foreign invasions. This revolution laid the groundwork for China to become a power on equal footing with other great world powers. Moreover, this revolution instituted land reform, promoted equality of the sexes, realized widespread literacy, and finally transformed Chinese society.

Gao sets out to demonstrate that the known story of Mao who led a revolution that transformed human life on such a dramatic scale cannot be dismissed by misleading and purposefully sensational claims. For Gao, It is simply illogical to argue that social change on such a scale was the result of a few personal power struggles and court conspiracies as Chang and Halliday contend.

==== Mao and the Great Leap Forward ====
Gao in his scholarship presents documentary evidence to show that Mao was in fact concerned with the shortcomings of the Great Leap Forward policy and took steps to alleviate the pressure this policy placed on rural farmers and others at the grassroots of China's rural society. Surprisingly, there is evidence to show Mao was in some respects more 'right wing' than some of his party colleagues in his attitude toward this economic and industrialization project.

On April 19, 1959, Mao wrote a letter to address six crucial issues about agricultural output and the truthful reporting of all production outputs. All the letters stressed moderation and called for cooling down Great Leap Forward hype. Mao even referred to himself as a 'conservative.' Mao took an unprecedented step by addressing it to six levels of government officials from provincial leaders down to production team leaders in villages. Gao suggests Mao was likely afraid that party bureaucrats at high levels might not pass on the instructions to the level of small rural villages . In these letters he stressed the importance of the responsibility system. Mao also pointed out that for the next ten years at least caution had to be taken so as not to boast about grain production. In Gao's telling of this history, Mao recognized that boastful unrealistic rhetoric could be dangerous.

in early April 1959, Mao at a Shanghai Politburo meeting criticized "zealots" at the Central Planning Commission and praised Chen Yun for his rational and cautious approach. Mao wanted the steel and iron production quotas to go down. In early 1958 Mao had warned the CCP leaders not to report false achievements. According to evidence published on September 7, 2007, in the Luoyang Daily it was Mao who during the Zhengzhou conference in March 1959 decided to temper hype surrounding the Great Leap Forward. This was starkly against the prevailing party trend at that time.

Gao argues that Mao should bear primary responsibility for the Great Leap famine; but other Chinese leaders such as Deng Xiaoping and Liu Shaoqi were also responsible. Liu in at least one occasion in 1958 talked about forming a commune as big as a country and about revolutionizing families by having husbands and wives living in different dormitories. On September 19, 1958, when told by a local leader in Jiangsu that one mu of land could produce ten thousand jin of rice, Liu wondered whether more was possible and suggested ploughing the soil deeper to produce more. In his memoirs, Wu Lengxi, then editor of the People's Daily remembered that Mao again and again urged him to be cautious in reporting economic figures so as not to mislead the party and the public. Wu confesses that he made mistakes by not having really understood what Mao meant and what the consequences were. Wu says that at the height of Great Leap mania Mao was in the minority urging caution whereas the majority included Liu Shaoqi.

In turn, Gao is highly critical of the historical accounts of the Great Leap Forward written by Yang Jisheng and Frank Dikotter. Mobo charges these historians with essentially cherry-picking data and in some instances fabricating data all-together to paint the Great Leap Forward, the famine and Mao in the worst possible light.

==== Deaths during the Great Famine ====
There is controversy surrounding the death toll of the great famine. Scholars have made different estimates ranging from 10 to 30 million deaths. These are estimates for a couple of reasons. One is that there was no reliable demographic census to make an accurate figure. Second, it is difficult to know which casualties were deaths by hunger or premature deaths due to hardship. Third, some estimates try to assess the 'missing' population on the basis of normal death and birth rates and therefore may have included millions of those who might not have been born. Fourth, currently natural disasters such as floods and droughts are not considered a factor for the famine during the period. Eyewitness accounts testify that in 1960 there was the worst flood disaster in a century. In many village case studies no death toll due to the famine is reported.

Gao makes a further argument about the nature of responsibility for the Great Leap Forward induced famine. Gao argues that Mao should certainly be held primarily responsible. Mao initiated the movement by criticizing other more cautious leaders before the Great Leap Forward started. Mao was also mainly responsible for the quick and drastic collectivization around the winter of 1957 and spring of 1958. The sudden change of organization from co-ops to big collective communes meant that no adequate supervision and monitoring system could be implemented to manage grain production. This failure undoubtedly had severe consequences in agricultural output. There was a food shortage everywhere in China and horrible famine in some areas. However, Gao argues that a policy disaster is not the same as deliberately planned mass murder.

In Gao's interpretation, the Great Leap Forward represents a disastrously failed trial of a different development model which prioritized local enterprise and decentralized industry. In this trial they attempted to create a work force that could be both industrial and agricultural, and a community that was not solely urban or rural. Some Great Leap Forward ideas were followed up during the late 1960s and 1970s when township and village enterprises that had started during the Great Leap Forward were encouraged to consolidate and develop further. China still currently faces difficulties over how to integrate the rural population into the broader economy. For Gao: "the Great Leap Forward idea was not some kind of madness, but theoretically guided rationality."

==== The economy in the Mao era ====
That hundreds of millions of people were positively affected in the Mao era economy is an important part of Gao's scholarly argument. The increase of life expectancy in the era of Mao alone has given an estimated 35 billion extra collective years of life to the Chinese population. Though living standards remained low, and were at subsistence level for many, excluding the Great Leap Forward years of 1959 and the Cultural Revolution years of 1967 and 1968, Chinese economic growth was not only steady but also outpaced most developing countries. By 1976 China had laid down a sound industrial and agricultural base for an economic boom. These facts speak to the accepted consensus by both Chinese and Western scholars doing macro studies, as well as micro case studies, of Maoist political economy.

Gao cautions against quoting claims by the post-Mao Chinese authorities that intend to denigrate the Mao era, as not to fall into the trap that: 'it must be true since the Chinese themselves say so.' To illustrate his point, he evokes Foster's case study of Zhejiang as a good example. The post-Mao authorities and elite intelligentsia in Zhejiang province condemn the Mao years and the Cultural Revolution by stating in the literature that it caused "grave losses to economic construction" and that: "the leftist policies caused the gross output of agriculture over four successive years to be lower than that of 1967." However, in the details one finds that Zhejiang experienced double-digit growth over the following five years from 1969 to 1973. These were of the impressive magnitude of 19.2 percent, 16.2 percent, 15.4 per cent, 10.2 percent and 11.5 percent." The late Mao era did not cause disaster for the provincial economy and in fact there was rapid growth of rural industry.

In the political-economy field, there is indeed a lot to suggest that the Mao era laid the groundwork for the economic transition of the following decades. Chris Bramall argues that under-industrialization and high illiteracy rates held the Chinese economy back for a long time and that the CCP's success in rectifying these problems would have significant long-term benefits for the Chinese economy. On China's economic development, Bramall is skeptical of the economic benefits of Land Reform and the Five-Year Plan. However, he does detect a coherent economic strategy in the period between 1964 and 1976 which he refers to as "late Maoism". The new policies of this period did not necessarily produce significantly improved economic performance in the short term. However, Bramall suggests that Late Maoism bequeathed a range of positive economic legacies to its successors, including improvements in basic education and infrastructure and the foundations of a "green revolution" in agriculture. Local industries were often plagued by low productivity in their early years, but they also laid the groundwork for the rural industrialization of the 1980s and 1990s. The leadership under Deng did not start from scratch but built on this positive legacy. In Bramall's economic investigation he concludes: "In a very real sense, Mao Zedong is the father of China's contemporary economic miracle."

Chinese political-economy expert Ho-fung Hung argues: "Mao and the CCP brought China into the modern world with a network of state industries and infrastructures; a large, educated, and healthy rural labor force; and a state autonomous from foreign governments and also free from international financial institutions like the IMF and World Bank."

China during the Mao years accomplished a lot in terms of economic development especially compared to other developing countries and latecomers to industrialization. Gao among others are making the argument that the legacies of Maoist political economy laid the foundation for the later success claimed by marketization reformers.

=== Cultural Revolution ===
==== Conflicting perspectives and how to represent Chinese people during the Cultural Revolution ====
Most historical accounts of the Cultural Revolution are written and told from the perspective of urban political and intellectual elites. Gao complicates this prevailing account by noting that the majority of China's population are urban workers and rural peasant farmers. Gao's writing on how the Gao villagers of Jiangxi had economic security and cultural dignity during the Cultural Revolution critiqued the tendency of Chinese liberals to focus on elite's perspectives of the period. Gao observed that in areas such as Gao village, Mao-era mass campaigns brought improvements in education and public health.

To illustrate this issue of bias in prevailing discussion and presentation of this history Gao recalls two accounts where the issue of bias and a presumption that urban intellectuals are representative of the vast majority of China's population came to the fore:

A Chinese academic Sun Ge gave a lecture on the Cultural Revolution in South Korea in 2007. In Gao's telling, Sun had thought she gave a balanced and fair view of how the Cultural Revolution happened. After her talk she was confronted by a Chinese student who asked, "What is your family background?" She admitted her parents were intellectuals who were victimized by this event. The student said "no wonder" for him and his rural based family they retain positive memories of the Cultural Revolution years. Somehow, this interaction led to Sun considering that there are views and perspectives of the Cultural Revolution that diverge wildly from her own.

Another episode reflecting the fraught nature of this historical experience and how intellectual bias is on display is recounted in the production of an exhibition about the Cultural Revolution organized by Steven Harrell and David Davies at the Burke Museum of Washington University in 2002. The exhibition displayed cultural artifacts from the Cultural Revolution such as cloth buttons and stamps. Items such as these often-carried slogans and messages with weighty ideological content. The exhibition presented two people with contradictory views on the experience of the Cultural Revolution. That the exhibition did not take a staunch stance against the Cultural Revolution infuriated many visitors who registered intense anti Cultural Revolution sentiments in the guest book and with the organizers. Visitors who came to the exhibition from China registered intense complaints that the exhibition was biased without reflecting on the notion that their views could not possibly be representative of the vast majority of Chinese people.

Gao recounts these episodes to reflect his observation that often-Chinese people of privilege assume that their own experience is representatives of the historical experience of Chinese people more broadly when this is simply not the case. In fact, Gao argues at length that Western derived concepts of race, ethnicity and nationality are insufficient in addressing who the Chinese are and especially when we approach complicated issues of class identity. Gao notes: "The term Chinese is undefinable in that it is not an ethnic term, nor is it a definite term referring to the citizens of China."

==== The Cultural Revolution as a "Haojie (Holocaust)" debate ====
There is a common assumption among western observers that the Cultural Revolution and Mao are comparable to the Holocaust and Hitler. In the Chinese media an often-deployed term Shi Nian Haojie ( 十年浩劫)is used to refer to the Cultural Revolution. This description is widely adopted by Chinese news media and even in official Chinese government documents. Shi Nian means ten years which is how the Cultural Revolution is commonly periodized. The term Haojie is difficult because it can be used to mean "Holocaust," or more traditionally as "great calamity" or "catastrophe." Gao observes that elite Chinese intelligentsia and political elites use the term to denounce the Cultural Revolution. For Gao, it reveals an inclination to exploit the diverse meanings of the term Haojie in order to denigrate the Cultural Revolution experience. In today's reactionary and ultra-capitalist CCP, a resolution was adopted on the history of the Mao-era that explains the Cultural Revolution as an episode where Mao Zedong deviated from his own thought. This official party opinion on the matter opens a door in the historical discourse for perspectives and agendas that want to interpret the Cultural Revolution as an unmitigated disaster.

The world's biggest source and propagator of the Haojie discourse is undoubtedly the Chinese government itself. The post Mao government and its propaganda bodies have been depicting the Cultural Revolution to the world as a ten-year period of calamities and near disintegration of the country's economy. Gao writes that when the post-Mao authorities set out to abandon the revolutionary aspirations of the Chinese Communist Revolution, they had to find a way to do so without jettisoning the entirety of China's revolutionary legacy- many parts of which serve to legitimate the CCP's enduring power. The way Chinese authorities solved with problem was by making the tenuous argument that the Cultural Revolution period represents an aberration and was fundamentally misguided. The majority of China's elite intellectuals have been uncritically echoing the official government position on the history of the Cultural Revolution.

This narration of the history of the Cultural Revolution was transmitted from Chinese authorities and elite intellectuals among the West's non-academic community. Once the "Holocaust" meaning of Haojie was accepted it became difficult to offer an alternative or contradictory interpretation of the Cultural Revolution without being accused of something akin to Holocaust denial. Both the current Chinese government and western liberal intellectuals follow a similar line and interpretation of Mao and the Cultural Revolution. Albeit for different reasons. The politically correct view of the Cultural Revolution amongst both these sources is to regard the event as a totalizing disaster and that Mao was a madman.

Gao is careful to point out that many people did indeed suffer and die over the course of the Cultural Revolution's ten-year period, 1966-1976. There were suicides, deaths from the factional infighting, there were cases of torture. Many lives were absolutely shortened as a result of the Cultural Revolution. Gao himself was put under house arrest and subject to struggle sessions. He understands denunciations of the Cultural Revolution by those who suffered during the event as understandable and a way to heal emotional trauma. However, the official state project of simplifying everything that happened during the Cultural Revolution as shi nian haojie is something else completely.

Gao offers a precise example of this. A prominent Chinese language e-journal huaxia enzhai featured a partial list of famous people who died during the years 1966-1976. The article claims that all of the listed people died as a consequence of persecution during the Cultural Revolution. However, for many names on this list there is no evidence that they were at all persecuted. It reflects that the premise of ten years of Cultural Revolution as catastrophe is deeply embedded in the Chinese new media as well.

==== Revolutionary violence ====
Gao poses an important historical question: how should we interpret the violence of the Cultural Revolution period? What distinguishes the violence and death of the Cultural Revolution from the acts of organized violence intended by official policies of Nazi Germany and the Nazi Holocaust? During the Cultural Revolution the nature of death and violence was multifaceted and corresponded to the mixture of anarchy and despotism of this event. However, unlike Nazi Germany, the fact is that there was no planned policy for violence during the Cultural Revolution years. Often the Chinese government took action to halt or slow down the violence.

At the height of the 'Red Terror' in 1966 the CCP approved a decree and issued it to the whole of China on 20 November 1966. The zhongyao tonggao decree stated that no factory, mine, school administration or any other such unit could be allowed to set up a detention center or a court for the purposes of political persecution. Gao is careful to note that decrees such as this did not squelch the violence completely and that Mao and other leaders often incited violence yet official policy strongly forbade violence. This policy was recorded in official documents and was promoted in speeches by various leaders.

Persecution and violence directed against people with wrong class backgrounds was widespread. However, the nature of the violence had a complicated composition and requires a nuanced view of this historical moment in order to understand how the violence was more informed by conditions of anarchy than by top-down policy directives from the state. Comparisons of Red Guards with Nazis may be significantly misleading. The Red Guards emerged from various places and often time acted in opposition to CCP directives and even in contradiction to Mao.

A lot of the violence during the late 1960s did not come from the Red Guards as many of the Red Guards and rebels became victims of persecution themselves.

==== Beneficial policies ====
Historical records reveal that the motivation behind the Cultural Revolution by Mao was to rectify proper ideology in Chinese Communist Party officials. To humiliate these party members was the intention-not to impose lethal violence. As the Cultural Revolution took on a life and inertia of its own small and disperse acts of violence snowballed into larger and more widespread violence. There is much to show that both Mao Zedong and Zhou Enlai made a substantial effort keep a lid on this violence. In 1969, more than two years after the start of the Cultural Revolution the People's Liberation Army was called in to reestablish order. The situation of widespread sporadic violence was tamed and China's economy was put back on a developmental growth path.

Going forward new socioeconomic policies were introduced. Gao makes the argument that these policies had a positive impact on a large number of people and they were intentionally designed as such. New features introduced in China's domestic social scene were a cheap and effective healthcare system, education in rural precincts, promotion of gender equality and so on. Gao himself grew up in China and claims that he witnessed how these policies had substantial benefits for rural people. After Mao, Deng Xiaoping reversed social programs and policies introduced during the Cultural Revolution. Institutions that had positive impacts for rural citizens disintegrated in the absence of government sponsorship. Gao is adamant that in terms of healthcare and education many of the rural poor simply became worse off than they were during the Cultural Revolution. Advancements in gender equality also have been reversed.

The Cultural Revolution and late Mao years includes positive developments in China's military capacities, urban industry, and agriculture. The official Chinese government line proclaims that the Chinese economy was near the point of total disintegration during the Cultural Revolution. Gao presents documentary evidence and special studies of the period to show that in reality the picture was more complicated and suggests an opposite conclusion. Gao concedes that it is true that the Chinese economy faced massive disruptions in the initial phases of the Cultural Revolution. Nonetheless by the late 1960s and throughout the entirety of the 1970s the economy showed consistent growth. A report from the Joint Economic Committee of the US congress concluded that during Mao's rule the Chinese economy has a "record of positive growth in both agriculture and industry." The CCP "had already created a significant economic base for the new post Mao leadership to build on." There is a strong suggestion in Gao's analysis that the negative economic impacts of the Cultural Revolution were not nearly as large as the current Chinese leadership contends. In important ways the Cultural Revolution's economic policies made the massive economic growth in the Chinese economy during the 1980s and beyond possible. The development of commune and production brigade enterprises during the Cultural Revolution made the township and village enterprises of the 1980s feasible.

For Gao's argument about the positive aspects of the Cultural Revolution experience there is an important distinction to be made what was intended and what was not. He draws on an analogy of the difference between murder and manslaughter: "When someone kill someone else we usually judge the case to be murder if the action was intentional; otherwise, it is a case of manslaughter." Gao recognizes that this interpretation may be disturbing and uncomfortable. Yet despite the experience of famine, He argues that Mao's China dramatically improved the lives of China's rural poor and urban worker populations. This is especially true when China is compared to India over the same period. As Amartya Sen observes: "India had, in terms of morbidity, mortality and longevity, suffered an excess in mortality over China of close to 4 million a year during the same period... thus, in this one geographical area alone, more deaths resulted from this 'failed capitalist experiment' (more than 100 million by 1980) than can be attributed to the 'failed communist experiment' all over the world since 1917"

==== Destruction of traditional and archeological artifacts ====
A huge controversy of the Cultural Revolution is the destruction Chinese traditional cultural artifacts. The perception in the Western non-academic community is that burning books and destroying temples and historical relics were common throughout the Cultural Revolution experience

There is no controversy over the fact that many episodes defined by the destruction of Chinese heritage sights and artifacts was a part of the Cultural Revolution. However there remains questions over whether these acts of destruction were universal and whether destruction of cultural and traditional features of Chinese society was an official policy of the Cultural Revolution government. Gao argues that no evidence has ever been put forward to support accusations that destruction was ever organized by the government or even sanctioned. In fact, official policy was to safeguard cultural relics. on May 14, 1967, the CCP Central Committee issued a document detailing instructions on how to protect traditional cultural institutions and relics. Major historically significant archaeological discoveries such as the Terracotta Army and Mawangdui tombs were made during this period and have been well-preserved. Gao points out that problems with maintaining and protecting sights of Chinese tradition has existed in China for millennia.

Radical anti-Chinese tradition ideology did indeed prevail during the Cultural Revolution. However, there were also efforts to preserve certain aspects of Chinese tradition. Mao was active in promoting traditional Chinese medicine and these medical practices were deeply supported by official policies, such as acupuncture. The Mawangdui tomb discoveries enabled the discovery in 1971 of a drug that led to a malaria cure.

Many artists and cultural workers were persecuted during the Cultural Revolution. At the same time tremendous efforts were being made to restore cultural activities. Radical artists took on an effort to find new methodologies towards creating literature and art. Peking Opera in particular was a sight of deep artistic innovation. Contemporary opera critics contend that model Peking operas created during the Cultural Revolution not only had revolutionary ideological content but were also revolutionary in artistic form. One such critic, Zhang Guangtian, argues that by utilizing western wind and string instruments and matching them with traditional Chinese instruments as well as putting together western ballet with traditional Peking opera- the model Peking operas developed an aesthetic theory successful for creating an art form that not only countered Western cultural imperialisms but developed a sensibility that was distinctly Chinese.

In Gao's recollection of rural life during the Cultural Revolution villagers often put on performances that meshed model Peking operas with local language and music. In doing so many villagers learned how to read and write through their involvement in local theatre. They organized sports meets and competition against other villages. The Cultural Revolution years created a public sphere where meetings and communications went beyond traditional village clans. "This has never happened before and it has never happened since."

Often overlooked are the widespread publications of underground cultural activities during the Cultural Revolution. One estimate is that more than 10,000 different newspapers and pamphlets were published during these years. There were more than 900 publications in Beijing alone. According to Chen, Mao himself read these publications carefully. The People's Daily commonly reprinted articles from non-official publications. Gao argues that Western academics overlook these cultural outputs to focus exclusively on Red Guard publications and this colors Western assessment of the event in negative ways. Contrarily, Gao argues there was unprecedented freedom of association and freedom of expression in non-institutionalized ways.

==== The Cultural Revolution and cultural creativity ====
Despite common depictions of the Cultural Revolution that characterize the period as one of artistic destruction, in reality there were notable achievements of cultural creativity during the Cultural Revolution era. In the fine arts space during the Cultural Revolution years of 1972 to 1975 China held four national fine arts exhibitions with more than 2,000 pieces of art selected from 12,800 works recommended from all over the country. Nearly 7.8 million visitors came to these exhibits. 65 percent of the exhibited works were created by amateurs. These works included oil paintings, traditional Chinese paintings, prints, sculpture, printing festival paintings picture story book paintings, charcoal drawings, watercolors, and paper cuts. These exhibitions were the first of their kind in China. Among the educated youth sent down to labor in the countryside were many accomplished artists who found inspiration in their lives and labor in rural China. Large-scale group sculptures of revolutionary subject matter also reached its pinnacle of aesthetic form during the Cultural Revolution. Gao writes that to say there was no artistic creativity during the Cultural Revolution is a myth.

The portrayal of China as a country devoid of culture during the Cultural Revolution is a commonly held falsehood among the non-academic West. By 1976 there were 542 official magazines and journals and 182 newspapers in circulation. The number of film units had increased from 20,363 in 1965 to 86,088 in 1976. Cultural clubs had increased from 2,598 to 2,609. Public libraries increased from 577 to 768. Museums from 214 to 263.

Educated youth among other Chinese were exposed to many works of literature such as works by Russian writers. They also created their own literature. Some writers now known in the West, such as Mang Ke and Duo Duo wrote extensively during the Cultural Revolution. An important example of literary output during this time includes the Chinese-English Dictionary. A group of academics worked collectively at the Beijing Foreign Language Institute for ten years to finish compiling this work which was first published in 1978.

== Works ==
=== Books ===
- Different Histories, Shared Future: Dialogues on Australia-China, ed. with Justin O'Conner, Baohui Xie, Jack Butcher, Springer Nature Singapore: Palgrave Macmillan, 2023.
- Gao Village: Rural Life in Modern China, London: C. Hurst & Co.; Hawaii: Hawaii University Press; Hong Kong: Hong Kong University Press; Bathurst: Crawford House Publishers, Australia, 1999, reprinted in paper back by Hawai'i University Press in 2007.
- A Reference Grammar of Mandarin Chinese, Queensland: XACT Publications, 2000.
- Mandarin Chinese: An Introduction, Melbourne: Oxford University Press, 2000, reprinted in 2002.
- The Battle of China's Past: Mao and the Cultural Revolution, London: Pluto Press, 2008.
- Constructing China: Clashing Views of the People's Republic, London: Pluto Press, 2018.
- Gao Village Revisited: Whither Rural China, Hong Kong: The Chinese University Press, 2019.

=== Articles (selection) ===
- Chinese What Chinese: The Politics of Authenticity and Ethnic Identity, in Lee Guan Kin, ed., National Boundaries and Cultural Configurations, Centre for Chinese Language and Culture and Global Publishing Co. Pte. Ltd, in print.
- China and Capitalism: If Market Capitalism Is Good for the West, Why Is Capitalism with Chinese Characteristics Bad?, Critical Perspectives on China's Economic Transformation, Introduction par Hari P. Sharma, Delhi, Daanish Bookjs, 2008
- The Question of Land: An Alternative Model to Modernity?, in Joseph Cheng, ed., Challenges and Policy Programmes of Chinese Next Leadership, City University of Hong Kong Press, Hong Kong, 2007, p. 413–434.
- Chinese Media Coverage of 9/11, with Ming Liang, in Tomasz Pludowski, ed., How the World's News Media Reacted to 9/11. Essays from Around the Globe, Marquette Books, Spokane, WA, 2007, p. 186–205.
- 關于「文化大革命」的記憶、思考和爭論: 解讀「浩劫」話語 (Memories of the Cultural Revolution: Deconstructing the Holocaust Discourse), in Song Geng ed., Globalization and Chineseness: Postcolonial Readings of Contemporary Culture (《全球化與「中國性」: 當代文化的後殖民解讀》), Hong Kong University Press, Hong Kong, 2006, p. 247–260.
- Introduction, in Eric Shaoquan Zhang, The Impact of ELT on Ideology in China (1980-2000), Shanghai, Central China Normal University Press, 2006, p. 1–10.
- Communist Economic Model, in Thomas Leonard, ed., Encyclopaedia of the Developing World, Vol. 1, Routledge, New York and Oxon, 2006. p. 385–387.
- 书写历史和高家村 (Writing History and Gao Village), in Luo Gang, 《年思想文集》 (Collected Writings on Ideas in 2004), 桂林: 广西师大出版社 2004, p. 266–273.
- The Rise of Neo-Nationalism and the New Left: A Post-Colonial and Postmodernism Perspective, in Leong Liew and Shaoguang Wang, eds., Nationalism, Democracy and National Integration in China, Routledge/Curzon, Londres, 2004, p. 44–62.
- The Great Wall that Divides Two Chinas and the Rural/Urban Disparity Challenge, in Joseph Cheng, ed., China's Challenges in the Twenty-First Century, City University of Hong Kong Press, Hong Kong, 2003, p. 533–557.
- 运用第一语言来学习第二语言 (Learn the Second language by Using the First Language), in Zhang Dexing and Li Xiaoqi, eds., 《队以英语为母语的汉语教学研究》 (Teaching Chinese to Students Whose Mother Tongue is English), 北京: 人民教育出版社, 2002, p. 296–308.
- Influence of Native Culture and Language on Intercultural Communication: the Case of PRC Student Immigrants in Australia, in Jens Allwood and Beatriz Dorriots, eds., The Diversity of Intercultural Communication, Papers in Anthropological Linguistics 28, Boteborg University, Boteborg, 2002, p. 33–53.
- 从一个极端到另一个极端: 是否该偏正一点儿? (From One Extreme to Another: Is It Time to Adjust the Swing of the Pendulum?), in Yang Jianli, ed., 《红色革命和黑色造反》(Red Revolution and Black Rebellion)Boston: Twenty-First Century Book Series Foundation for China in the 21st Century, 1997, p. 17–34.
- Welfare Problems and Needs for Migrant Workers in South China, Chapter 6, in Wing Lo and Joseph Cheng, eds., Social Welfare Development in China, Constraints and Challenges, Imprint Publications, Chicago, 1997, p. 101–120.
- Self-Reference Materials: A Grammar Hand Book, in Mary Farquhar and Penny McKay eds., China Connections: Australia Business Needs and University Language Education, National Language and Literacy Institute of Australia, Canberra, 1996, p. 246–257.
- Migrant Workers from Rural China: Their Conditions and Some Social Implications for Economic Development in South China, in David Schak ed., Entrepreneurship Economic Growth and Social Change: The Transformation of Southern China, Centre for the Studies of Australian and Asian Relations, Queensland, 1994, p. 21–38.

=== Reviews ===
Gao has written numerous reviews in various journals and on-line magazines, including: Portal, The International Journal of Humanities, Journal of Chinese Australia, China Study Group, Critical Asian Studies / Bulletin of Concerned Asian Scholars, Asia Media, Asian Studies Review, China Information, Pacific Asian Education, The Hong Kong Journal of Social Sciences, Journal of Contemporary Asia, Intercultural Communication, China Report (New Delhi), International Migration Quarterly Review, Pacific-Asian Education, Ming Pao Monthly, The Babel, The Copenhagen Journal of Asian Studies, China Rights Forum, Australian Journal of Linguistics, Proceedings of Leiden Conference for Junior Linguists, New Statesman, Chinese News Digest, 《中国2000论坛》 (on-line journal), China and World (on-line journal), Australian-China Review, and Australia-Asian Society of Tasmania Newsletter.
