= Tomb Sweeping (short story collection) =

2023 short story collection by Alexandra Chang

- Author: Alexandra Chang
- Genre: Literary fiction
- Publisher: Ecco Press
- Publication date: August 8, 2023
- Pages: 256
- ISBN: 978-0062951847
- Preceded by: Days of Distraction

Tomb Sweeping is a 2023 short story collection by American writer Alexandra Chang, published by Ecco Press. Set across China and the United States, the book's fifteen stories explore family, relationships, loneliness, and the American Dream. Chang's first short story collection, the book made several year-end best-of and must-read lists.

== Critical reception ==
Kirkus Reviews found the book "uneven" with some stories ending in a manner that "comes across as arbitrary." In a starred review, Publishers Weekly called it a "powerful and delightfully strange debut collection."

Datebook lauded Chang's "precise prose" and also found that "Chang ... also proves herself to be a master of flash fiction." The Millions wrote that "Although the emotions and relationships in Tomb Sweeping feel at times provisionally sketched, the collection coheres on a subconscious level, revealing the self-centered desires that lurk in the most seemingly neutral acts of intergenerational care." Northwest Review wrote that "Chang's stories reveal humanity through the mundane." USA Today called it a "playful and deeply affective short story collection". The Rumpus wrote that Chang's characters "brim with life by virtue of Chang's irrefutable talent and remarkable ability to find beauty—and meaning—in life's daily complexities."

San Francisco Chronicle placed the book on their list of Favorite Fiction and Nonfiction Books of 2023, calling it "Compelling and compulsively readable" from a "writer who's only just beginning to show her impressive range." Electric Literature included it on their list of Best Short Story Collections of 2023, calling it a "brilliant collection". The Washington Post named it in an article about "impressive short-story collections" in August 2023.

== Stories ==
| Title | Also published in |
|---|---|
| "Unknown by Unknown" | |
| "Li Fan" | 3:AM Magazine |
| "To Get Rich is Glorious" | Zoetrope: All-Story |
| "Farewell, Hank" | |
"Cure for Life"
"Klara"
"A Visit"
| "Flies" | Harvard Review |
| "She Will Be a Swimmer" | |
| "Phenotype" | Electric Literature |
| "Me and My Algo" | |
"Persona Development"
| "Tomb Sweeping" | Glimmer Train |
| "Cat Personalities" | |
"Other People"
