= Alexandra Chang (curator) =

American art historian and curator

- Occupations: Art historian, curator

Alexandra Chang is an Asian-American art curator, art historian, and editor. Chang co-founded the peer-reviewed journal Asian Diasporic Visual Cultures and the Americas in 2015.

In 2009, Timezone 8 Editions published Chang's book Envisioning Diaspora : Asian American visual arts collectives from Godzilla, Godzookie to the Barnstormers, which had a foreword by art historian Margo Machida. In 2015, Chang and Alice Ming Wai Jim co-founded the journal Asian Diasporic Visual Cultures and the Americas, which they continue to serve as co-editor-in-chiefs.

In April 2018, Chang's book Circles and Circuits: Chinese Caribbean Art, which addresses Chinese diasporic community in the Caribbean, was published by Duke University Press. Chang was a co-curator with Zarina Hashmi on the Dark Roads exhibition, which commemorated the 70th anniversary of the 1947 Partition of Bengal. Chang was also the project director for The Virtual Asian American Art Museum. In 2019, ArtTable, a professional organization dedicated to the advancement of women in visual arts, awarded Chang with the New Leadership Award for her role as Curator of Special Projects and Director of Global Arts Programs at Asian/Pacific/American Institute at New York University (NYU). While working at NYU, Chang was part of the 2019 organizing committee for the Diasporic Asian Art Network. She also served on the curatorial committee for the Smithsonian Archives of American Art and the National Portrait Gallery's 2019-2020 exhibit - What is Feminist Art? Chang works as an Associate Professor in Rutgers University's Department of Arts, Culture and Media.

In 2021, Chang, along with 18 other members of the artist collective Godzilla, signed a letter to the Museum of Chinese in America (MOCA) withdrawing from an exhibit they were featured in as a way to protest MOCA's 'complicity' with the city plan to build a new jail in Chinatown. In the same year, Chang was a panelist at the College Art Association conference for an event titled "Futures of 'Activists' Scholarship." In 2022, Chang co-curated the exhibit "Imagining Justice—Asian American Art Movements" at the Mōri Museum.
