= Alexandra Chang (writer) =

American novelist

- Education: University of California, Berkeley; Syracuse University (MFA)
- Occupation: Writer
- Website: www.alexandrachang.com

Alexandra Chang is an American writer best known for her work Days of Distraction, released by Ecco Books in 2020.

== Life ==
Chang grew up in mostly in San Francisco and Davis, California. She graduated from UC Berkeley and received her MFA from Syracuse University in 2018. She currently lives in Ithaca, NY with her husband, and their dog and cat.

Chang used to write about technology for Wired. In an interview for BOMB Magazine, Chang said of that time: "When I started as a tech reporter, I felt like I made it. It was a thrill to cover these companies and start-ups that were becoming a huge part of all our lives...Over time, I started to feel disillusioned with the job...I wanted to capture how it can be for a young woman of color in these predominantly white spaces, where the system is working against her in small and large ways, and how that affects her psyche and ability to continue contributing to those spaces."

== Career ==
Days of Distraction follows a 24-year-old narrator, a staff writer at a tech publication who is continuously undervalued at her company. When her longtime boyfriend, J, gets into Cornell for graduate school, she decides to move to Ithaca with him. But instead of the fresh new start she hoped for, she finds herself with misgivings about her role in an interracial relationship. She turns to Asian American history to try and rediscover her sense of self, confronting the question: What does it mean to exist in a society that does not notice or understand you?

USA Today said Days of Distraction is "Gripping…. Pointed, witty, and free of easy resolutions. And Chang’s deadpan style offers up moments of absurd humor…. Chang shows the challenge of trying to raise issues about racism that even those closest to her wish to avoid. Struggling to spark a conversation nobody wants to have, she conducts an engrossing one with herself."

O, The Oprah Magazine said Chang "transmutes millennial malaise into an astute meditation on identity in the age of algorithms with this deadpan novel of an Asian American journalist fighting to be truly seen—by both her employer and her white boyfriend."

Chang previously worked as a technology reporter for WIRED and Macworld.

In Vanity Fair, Chang said that at the time she was writing her novel, “I was drawn to books that played with both nonfiction, memoir elements and ultimately inhabit the space of fiction because of the way they’re written, or the way the character functions, or the ways that the author has moved away from any sort of ‘rules’ of memoir.”

George Saunders called the novel a "startlingly original and deeply moving debut—kaleidoscopic, funny, heart-rending, beautifully observed, and formally daring." The Washington Post said "The story is fractured, like our attention, our nation, our relationships; the information looks like the snippets we consume: Facebook posts, tweets, Google results. But for all its formal interplay and textual shifts, the novel is also, somehow, a cohesive, thoroughly absorbing read. It’s a mixed marriage of new forms and old that captures modern life then shapes it into something artistically abiding." The New York Times called it "a winning novel from a writer to watch."

Days of Distraction includes a fragment from Maxine Hong Kingston's The Woman Warrior, of which Chang says: "I read Woman Warrior when I was an undergraduate, in my sophomore or junior year. Before that, I had never read a memoir by a Chinese American woman… It was a foundational text to me."

Chang has a short story collection named Tomb Sweeping that was published in 2023 by Ecco Books.
