= Special economic zones of China =

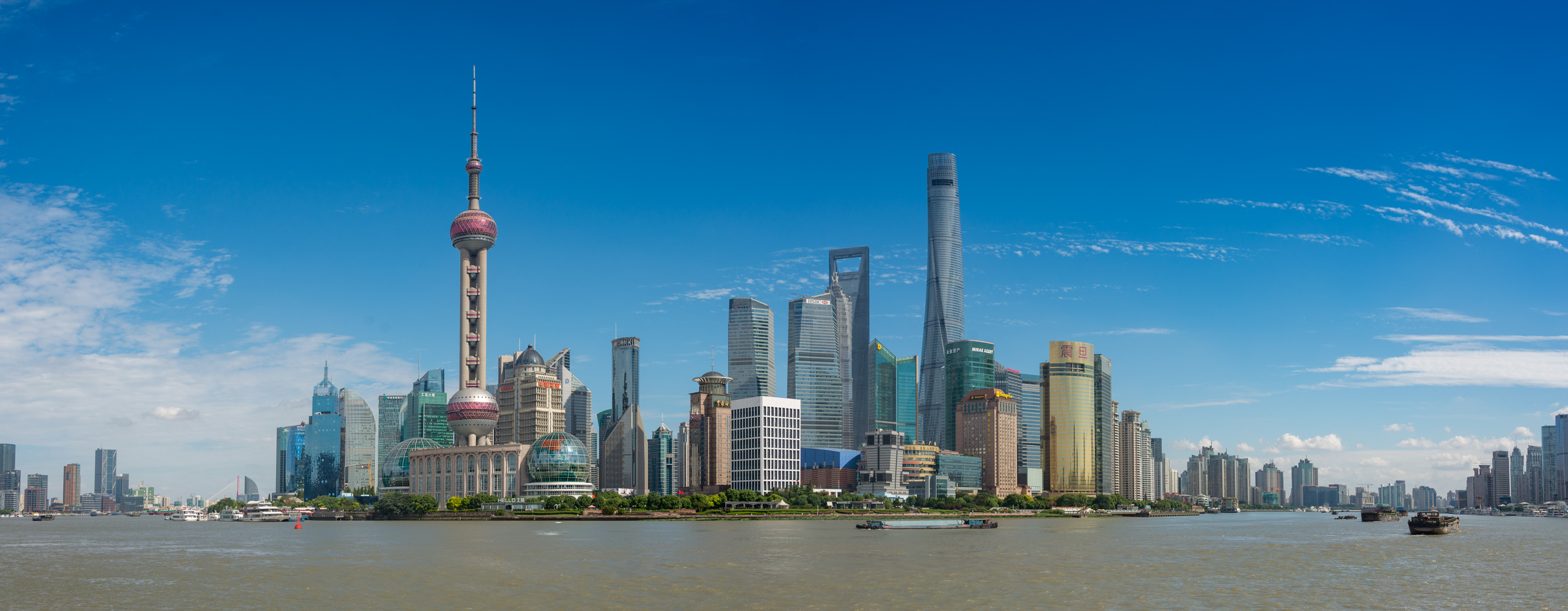
Lujiazui Financial and Trade Zone skyline in Shanghai

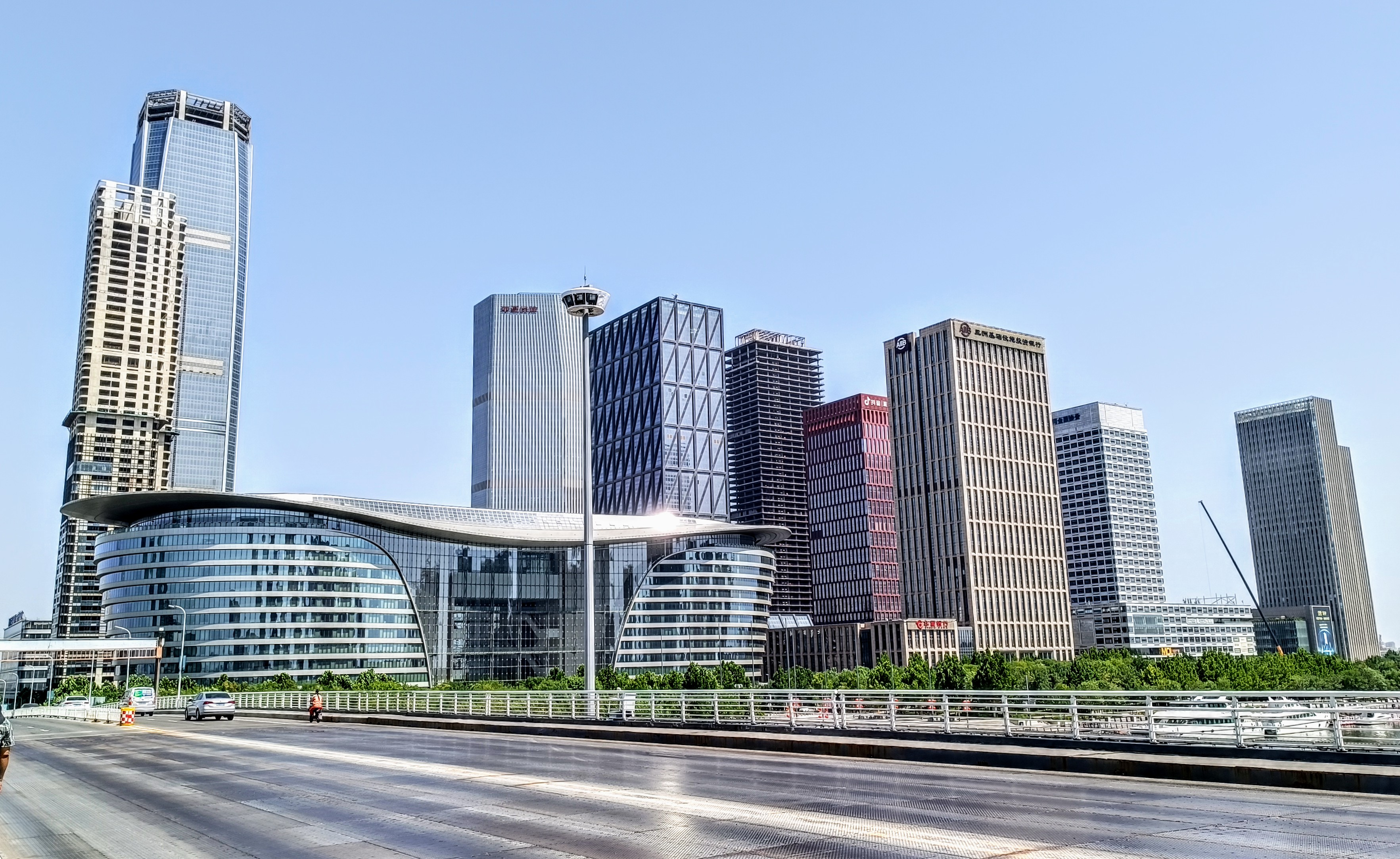
Yujiapu Financial District in Tianjin

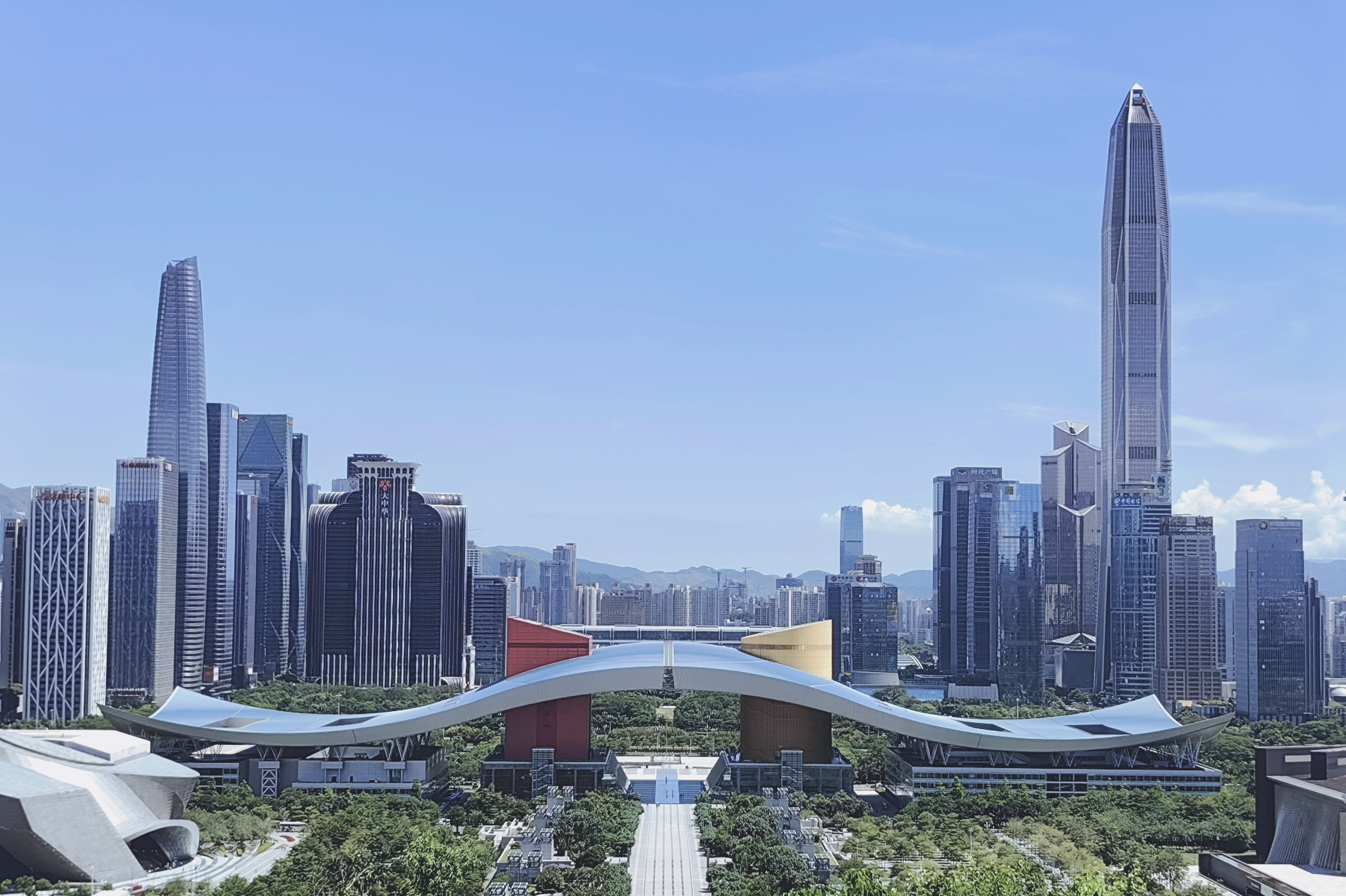
Civic Center in Shenzhen

In the People's Republic of China, a special economic zone (SEZ; Chinese: 经济特区; pinyin: jīngjì tèqū) is a designated area with economic policies and regulations designed to attract foreign business. These zones have more market-oriented business regulations compared to the rest of the country.

They were established to attract foreign investment, boost different forms of economic growth, and facilitate experimentation with market reforms. Many of these zones can be attributed to the policies of Deng Xiaoping during the early 1980s.

One of the larger reforms under Deng was establishing four SEZs along the South-eastern coast of China, with Shenzhen, Shantou, and Zhuhai located in Guangdong province and Xiamen located in Fujian province. These initial SEZs were all established from 1980 to 1981. As of 2024, there have been 3 additional special economic zones. In 1988, Hainan province became the fifth SEZ. In 1990, Pudong district in Shanghai became the sixth SEZ. In 2009, Binhai district in Tianjin became the seventh SEZ. Special economic zones in mainland China are granted more market-oriented economic policies and flexible governmental measures by the government of China in an effort to be more attractive to foreign and domestic businesses.

In SEZs, foreign and domestic trade and investment are conducted with tax and business incentives to attract foreign investment and technology. Trade was originally controlled by China's centralized government, however, these special zones allowed market-driven capitalist policies to be implemented to entice foreign capital investments in China. In 1986, China then added 14 additional cities to the list of special economic zones. By the 2020s, the combined number of SEZs, national-level new areas, and free trade zones in China reached 45.

As of 2025, China has significantly expanded its SEZs and become standardized across the country, leading to both futurist speculation of the country and criticism. Many similar areas are in development in hopes to promote economic development in key industries and attract further foreign investment.

== Implementation history ==
The concept of a special economic zone arose in the late 1950s in Ireland. The Irish government established the Shannon Free Zone to encourage foreign investment through tax incentives. Various Chinese leaders visited the Shannon Free Zone, including Jiang Zemin in 1980, and later Zhu Rongji, Wen Jiabao, and Xi Jinping.

In the late 1970s, and especially at the 3rd plenary session of the 11th Central Committee of the Chinese Communist Party in December 1978, the Chinese government initiated its policy of reform and opening up, a shift away from Maoist economic policy towards efforts to produce greater economic growth which would allow China to be competitive against not only industrialized nations of the west but also rising regional powers: Japan, South Korea, Singapore, Taiwan, and Hong Kong.

Officials in Guangdong led by provincial party secretary Xi Zhongxun and Yang Shankun sought to make Guangdong a national demonstration zone for reform and opening up, starting with an investment project in Shekou prepared by Yuan Geng on behalf of the Hong Kong-based China Merchants Steam Navigation Company. This project, initially a ship breaking facility, was approved by Li Xiannian on January 31, 1979. In April 1979, Xi Zhongxun and other Guangdong officials presented in Beijing a proposal to give broader flexibility to the coastal provinces of Guangdong and Fujian to attract foreign investment, with additional exemptions in four cities, namely Shenzhen in the Pearl River Delta region, Zhuhai and Shantou in Guangdong and Xiamen (Amoy) in Fujian Province. For these, paramount leader Deng Xiaoping coined the name "special zones" and characterized them as experiments in the mold of the pre-1949 Communist base areas. The proposal was approved on July 15 and the four special zones were officially established on August 26, 1979.

The four original SEZs were located in coastal Guangdong and Fujian partly because those provinces had longstanding links with the outside world and were geographically positioned near Hong Kong, Macau, and Taiwan. Shenzhen's location next to Hong Kong was especially strategic, while Xiamen's location near Taiwan made it a logical site for attracting external capital, technology, and managerial expertise. By the end of 1990, exports to Hong Kong accounted for two-thirds of Guangdong's industrial output. As part of an effort to overcome domestic political resistance, the name "special economic zone" was ultimately chosen over "special zone" to emphasize that only economic, not political, experiments should be carried out.

Within these SEZs, export-focused businesses had flexibility to respond more quickly to demand in foreign markets. These initial SEZs successfully attracted foreign capital, primarily from ethnic Chinese in Taiwan, Hong Kong, and Southeast Asia. Many foreign businesses in these areas were motivated to move production to China's SEZs because of lower labour costs, preferential economic policies, and the general trend of offshoring more simple manufacturing as globalization increased.

Successes in the initial SEZs led to the establishment of additional SEZs in 14 coastal cities: Dalian, Qinhuangdao, Tianjin, Yantai, Qingdao, Lianyungang, Nantong, Shanghai, Ningbo, Wenzhou, Fuzhou, Guangzhou, Zhanjiang and Beihai. Since 1988, mainland China's opening to the outside world has been extended to its border areas, areas along the Yangtze River and inland areas. First, the state decided to turn Hainan Island into mainland China's biggest special economic zone (approved by the 1st session of the 7th National People's Congress in 1988) and to enlarge the other four special economic zones.

Shortly afterwards, the State Council expanded the open coastal areas, extending into an open coastal belt the open economic zones of the Yangtze River Delta, Pearl River Delta, Xiamen-Zhangzhou-Quanzhou Triangle in south Fujian, the Shandong Peninsula, the Liaodong Peninsula (in Liaoning Province), Hebei Province and Guangxi autonomous region. In June 1990, the Chinese government opened the Pudong New Area in Shanghai to overseas investment, and additional cities along the Yangtze River valley, with Shanghai's Pudong New Area as its "dragon head."

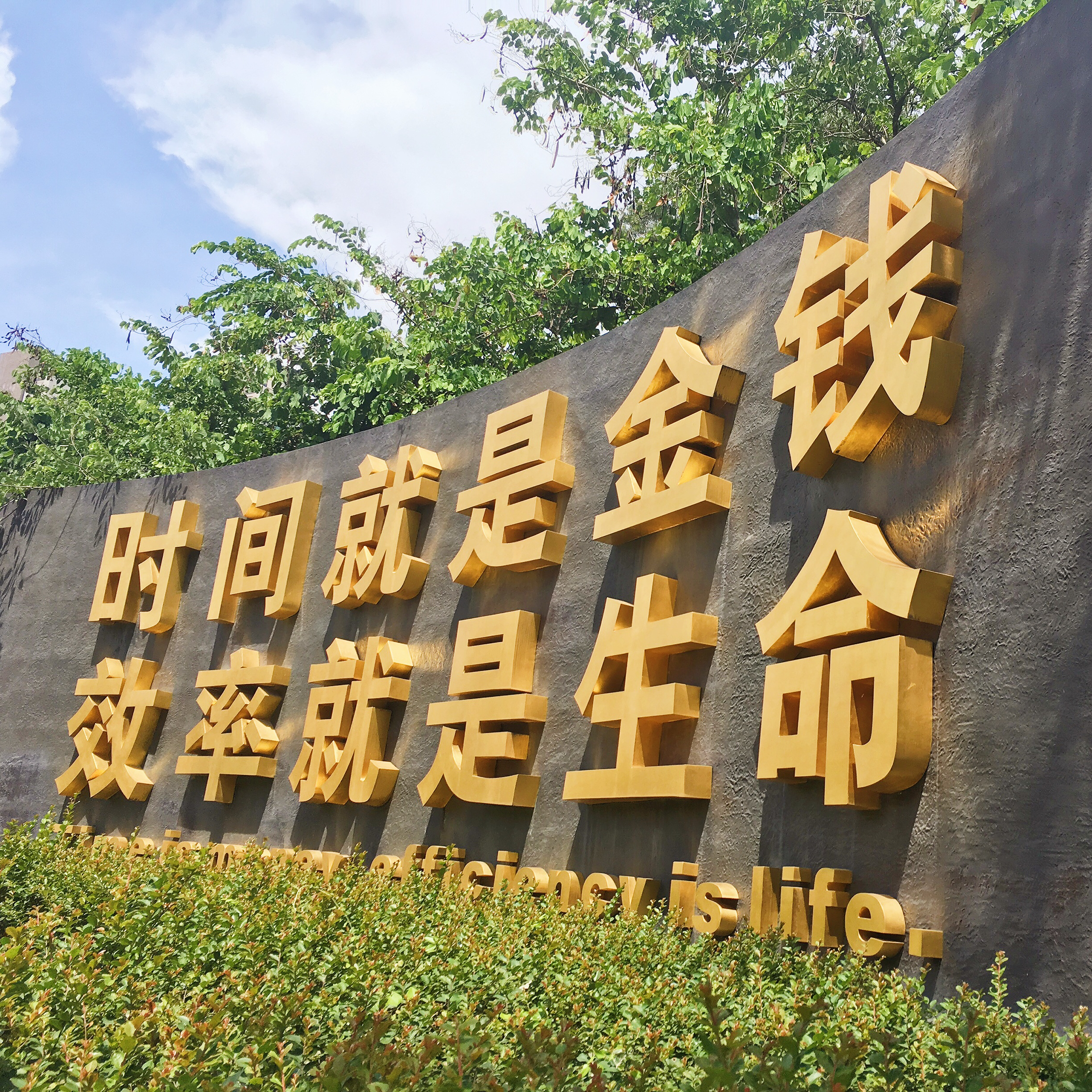
The slogan "Time is Money, Efficiency is Life" from Shekou, Shenzhen, representing the "Shenzhen speed"

Since 1992, the State Council has opened a number of border cities and, in addition, all the capital cities of inland provinces and autonomous regions. In addition, free trade zones, state-level economic and technological development zones, and new and high-tech industrial development zones have been established in large and medium-sized cities. These open areas play the dual roles of "windows" in developing the foreign-oriented economy, generating foreign exchanges through exporting products and importing advanced technologies and of "radiators" in accelerating inland economic development.

Most of China's SEZs are located in former treaty ports and is considered to have symbolic significance in demonstrating a "reversal of fortunes" in China's dealings with foreigners since the century of humiliation. Researcher Zongyuan Zoe Liu writes that "[t]he success of these cities as 'red' treaty ports represented another step in China's overall reform and opening-up plan while legitimizing the leadership of the CPC over the Chinese state and people."

Primarily geared to exporting processed goods, the five SEZs are foreign trade-oriented areas. Foreign firms benefit from preferential policies, such as lower tax rates, reduced regulations and special managerial systems.

Since its founding in 1992, the Shanghai Pudong New Area has made progress in both absorbing foreign capital and accelerating the economic development of the Yangtze River valley. The government has extended special preferential policies to the Pudong New Area that are not currently enjoyed by the special economic zones. For instance, in addition to the preferential policies of reducing or eliminating Customs duties and income tax common to the economic and technological development zones, the state also permits the zone to allow foreign business people to open financial institutions and run tertiary industries. In addition, the state has given Shanghai permission to set up a stock exchange, expand its examination and approval authority over investments and allow foreign-funded banks to engage in RMB business. In 1999, the GDP of the Pudong New Area came to 80 billion yuan, and the total industrial output value, 145 billion yuan.

In May 2010, the PRC designated the city of Kashgar in Xinjiang a SEZ. Kashgar's annual growth rate was 17.4 percent in 2009, and Kashgar's designation has since increased tourism and real estate prices in the city. Kashgar is close to China's border with the independent states of former Soviet Central Asia, and the SEZ seeks to capitalize on international trade links between China and those states.

== List of SEZs and open coastal cities ==
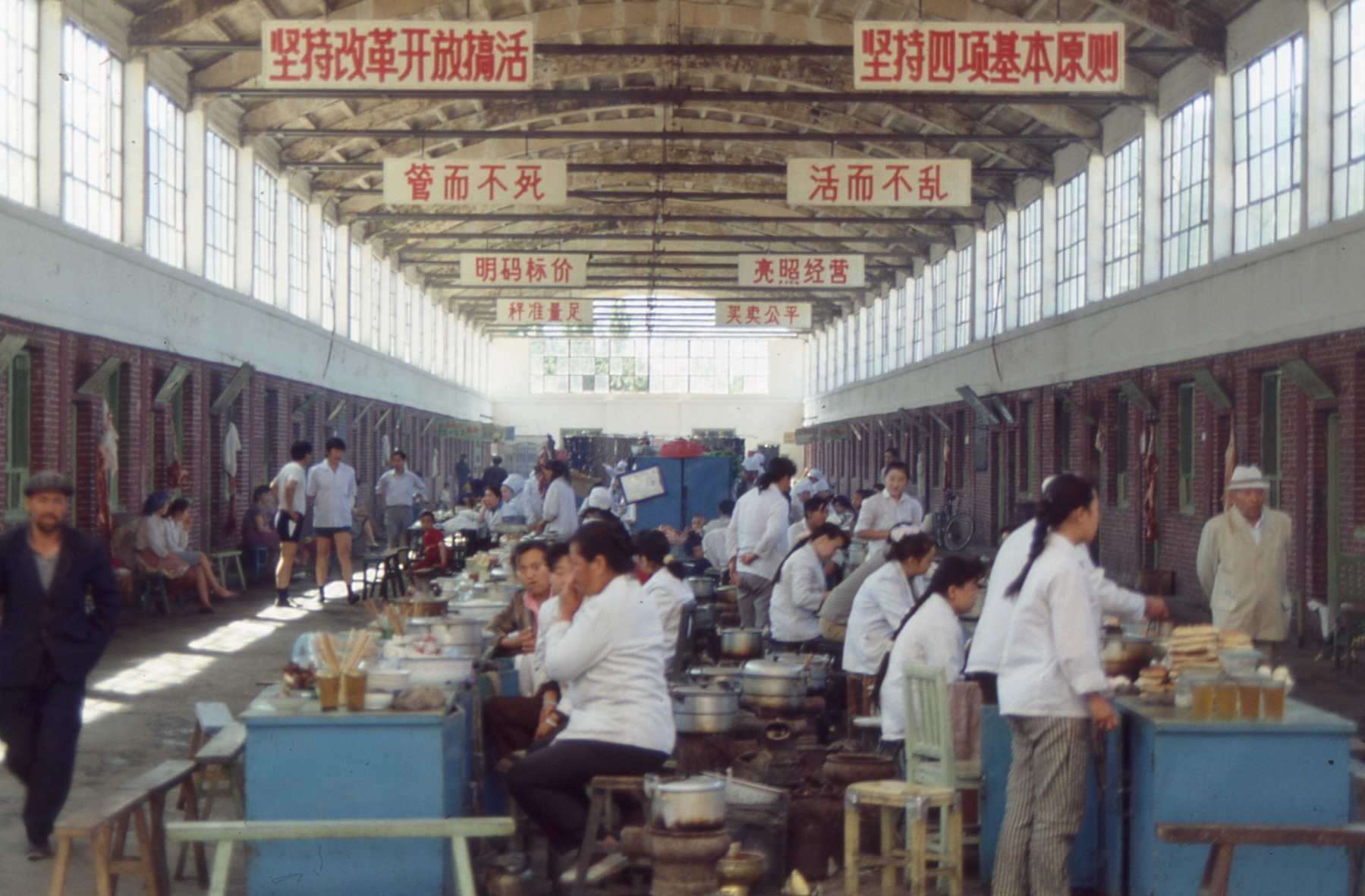
A market in Kashgar, Xinjiang in 1992, with slogans "adhere to Reform and Opening" (left) and "uphold the Four Cardinal Principles" (right).

As part of its economic reforms and policy of opening to the world, between 1978 and 1984 China established special economic zones (SEZs) in Shantou, Shenzhen, and Zhuhai in Guangdong Province and Xiamen in Fujian Province as well as designating the entire island province of Hainan as a special economic zone.

In 1984, China opened 14 other coastal cities to overseas investment (listed from north to south): Dalian, Qinhuangdao, Tianjin, Yantai, Qingdao, Lianyungang, Nantong, Shanghai, Ningbo, Wenzhou, Fuzhou, Guangzhou, Zhanjiang, and Beihai. These coastal cities have been designated "open coastal cities" (simplified Chinese: 沿海开放城市; traditional Chinese: 沿海開放城市; pinyin: yánhǎi kāifàng chéngshì).

Then, beginning in 1985, the central government expanded the coastal area by establishing the following open economic zones (listed from north to south): the Liaodong Peninsula, Hebei Province (which surrounds Beijing and Tianjin; see Jing-Jin-Ji), the Shandong Peninsula, Yangtze River Delta, Xiamen-Zhangzhou-Quanzhou Triangle in southern Fujian Province, the Pearl River Delta, and Guangxi Zhuang Autonomous Region.

In 1990, the Chinese government decided to open the Pudong New Area in Shanghai to overseas investment, as well as more cities in the Yangtze River valley. Since 1992, the State Council has opened a number of border cities and all the capital cities of inland provinces and autonomous regions.

Type	City	Province
Special economic zone – Province	-	Hainan
Special economic zone – City	Xiamen	Fujian
Special economic zone – City	Shantou	Guangdong
Special economic zone – City	Shenzhen	Guangdong
Special economic zone – City	Zhuhai	Guangdong
Special economic zone – City	Kashgar	Xinjiang
Open coastal city	Shanghai	
Open coastal city	Tianjin	
Open coastal city	Fuzhou	Fujian
Open coastal city	Guangzhou	Guangdong
Open coastal city	Zhanjiang	Guangdong
Open coastal city	Beihai	Guangxi
Open coastal city	Qinhuangdao	Hebei
Open coastal city	Lianyungang	Jiangsu
Open coastal city	Nantong	Jiangsu
Open coastal city	Dalian	Liaoning
Open coastal city	Qingdao	Shandong
Open coastal city	Yantai	Shandong
Open coastal city	Ningbo	Zhejiang
Open coastal city	Wenzhou	Zhejiang

== Economic policies of the SEZs ==
Economic policies of SEZs included tax exemptions, reduced custom duties, reduced priced land, and increased flexibility to negotiate labour contracts and financial contracts. SEZs were also authorized to develop their own legislation. The Shenzhen Special Economic Zone was the most active SEZ for legislative experiments over the period 1979–1990.

China's special economic zones facilitated technology transfer. Foreign investors in SEZs could negotiate to sell some of their goods produced in the SEZ to Chinese markets (although they could not compete with China-produced goods) provided they agree to significant technology transfer. This policy approach became known as "trading market for technology".

== Shenzhen's economic transformation ==
Out of the special zones Shenzhen had one of the greatest changes, going from 126 square miles of villages into a business metropolis. As seen by the table below, the ten years of economic reform from 1980 to 1990 increased population in Shenzhen by six-fold, GDP by around sixty-fold, and gross industrial output by two-hundredfold. Before 1980, Shenzhen's GDP was just 0.2 percent of Hong Kong's. In 2018, the city's GDP hit 2.42 trillion yuan (US$372 billion), overtaking Hong Kong. This change in Shenzhen prompted Chinese central authorities to instruct provincial officials to learn from Shenzhen.

Year	Population (thousands people)	GDP (million yuan)	Gross industrial output (million yuan)
1980	332.9	270	99
1982	449.5	826	424
1985	881.5	3902	3119
1990	1,677	17,167	20,912
2022	17,680	3,240,000	4,500,000

== Overseas SEZs ==
From 1990 to 2018, Chinese enterprises established eleven SEZs in sub-Saharan Africa and the Middle East including: Nigeria (two), Zambia, Djibouti, Kenya, Mauritius, Mauritania, Egypt, Oman, and Algeria. Generally, the Chinese government takes a hands-off approach, leaving it to Chinese enterprises to work to establish such zones (although it does provide support in the form of grants, loans, and subsidies, including support via the China Africa Development Fund). Such zones fall within the Chinese policy to go out and compete globally. The Forum on China-Africa Cooperation promotes these SEZs.

In southeast Asia, both state-owned and private Chinese companies are active in developing SEZs abroad consistent with the Chinese government's strategic priorities. Efforts in these SEZs are often viewed as part of the Belt and Road Initiative. China is involved in southeast Asia SEZs that include industrial parks, special export processing zones, technology parks, and innovation areas. From the Chinese government perspective, Chinese participation in overseas SEZs helps to increase demand for Chinese machinery and equipment and helps restructure the domestic Chinese industrial value chain by moving low-end production activity abroad. It can also help bypass trade barriers during periods of friction such as the U.S.-China trade war by facilitating exports to Europe and North America.

The Chinese government has identified certain southeast Asian SEZs as highlighted destinations for Chinese investment. These highlighted overseas SEZs include: Kawasan Industri Terpadu Indonesia-China, Sihanoukville Special Economic Zone in Cambodia, Thailand-China Rayong Industrial Park (RIP), Longjiang Industrial Park in Vietnam, Vientiane Saysettha Development Zone in Laos, and Malaysia-China Kuantan Industrial Park.

The Sihanoukville Special Economic Zone began with a focus on manufacturing consumer goods with the goal of transitioning to producing machinery, photovoltaic materials, and chemicals. It received support from China's Ministry of Commerce and the Export-Import Bank of China. As of March 2020, the Sihanoukville Special Economic Zone had 174 factories employing more than 30,000 people.

The RIP is China's largest industrial cluster and manufacturing export area in Thailand. As of late 2018, the RIP has more than 120 Chinese-owned companies, employs 35,000 (largely Thai nationals), and its gross industrial output was $12 billion.

The first Chinese overseas SEZs facilitated the offshoring of labour-intensive and less competitive industries, for example in textiles. As Professor Dawn C. Murphy summarizes, these zones now "aim to transfer China's development successes to other countries, increase business opportunities for China manufacturing companies, avoid trade barriers by setting up zones in countries with preferential trade access to important markets, and create a positive business environment for Chinese small and medium-sized enterprises investing in these regions." Overseas SEZs also foster support for China in the international system and help advocate for developing country causes through South–South cooperation. They "help China demonstrate it is acting as a responsible great power in these regions."

== Long-term effects ==
Deng described China's SEZs as "social and economic laboratories where foreign technologies and managerial skills could be observed", including in the development of manufacturing technology, a private real estate market, and management techniques.

Many scholars argue that SEZs played a decisive role in the development of China and the success of communism as implemented in China. Since their inception, SEZs have contributed 22% of China's GDP, 45% of total national foreign direct investment, and 60% of exports. SEZs are estimated to have created over 30 million jobs, increased the income of participating farmers by 30%, and accelerated industrialization, agricultural modernization, and urbanization.

SEZs became destinations for workers from across southern and southwest China, particularly younger women who could earn significantly more for factory work than they could earn in their hometowns.

A 2022 study in the American Economic Journal found that SEZs in China led to increased human capital investment with improved educational outcomes.

China has seen some benefits from SEZs through foreign enterprises bringing in expertise, technology, and equipment. In turn, private firms have benefitted from cheaper labour, a business-friendly environment, robust infrastructure, and China's large domestic market. Despite these changes, many scholars have taken issues with SEZs often involving policy prioritizing the short-term gains, encompassing a limited number of industries, and lack of entrepreneurial promotion are pointed out by critics of the SEZs. Others, like Gopalakrishnan, say that "left out of the picture are inequities in development, arable land loss, real estate speculation and labour violence", as well as significant transparency problems in bureaucracy.

== See also ==
- Economy of China
- Megalopolises in China
- New areas
- Special administrative regions of China
- Northeast Area Revitalization Plan
