= Shenzhen speed =

Term used to describe early stages of Chinese economic reform

- Chinese: 深圳速度
Transcriptions
Standard Mandarin
- Hanyu Pinyin: Shēnzhèn Sùdù
Yue: Cantonese
- Jyutping: sam1 zan3 cuk1 dou6

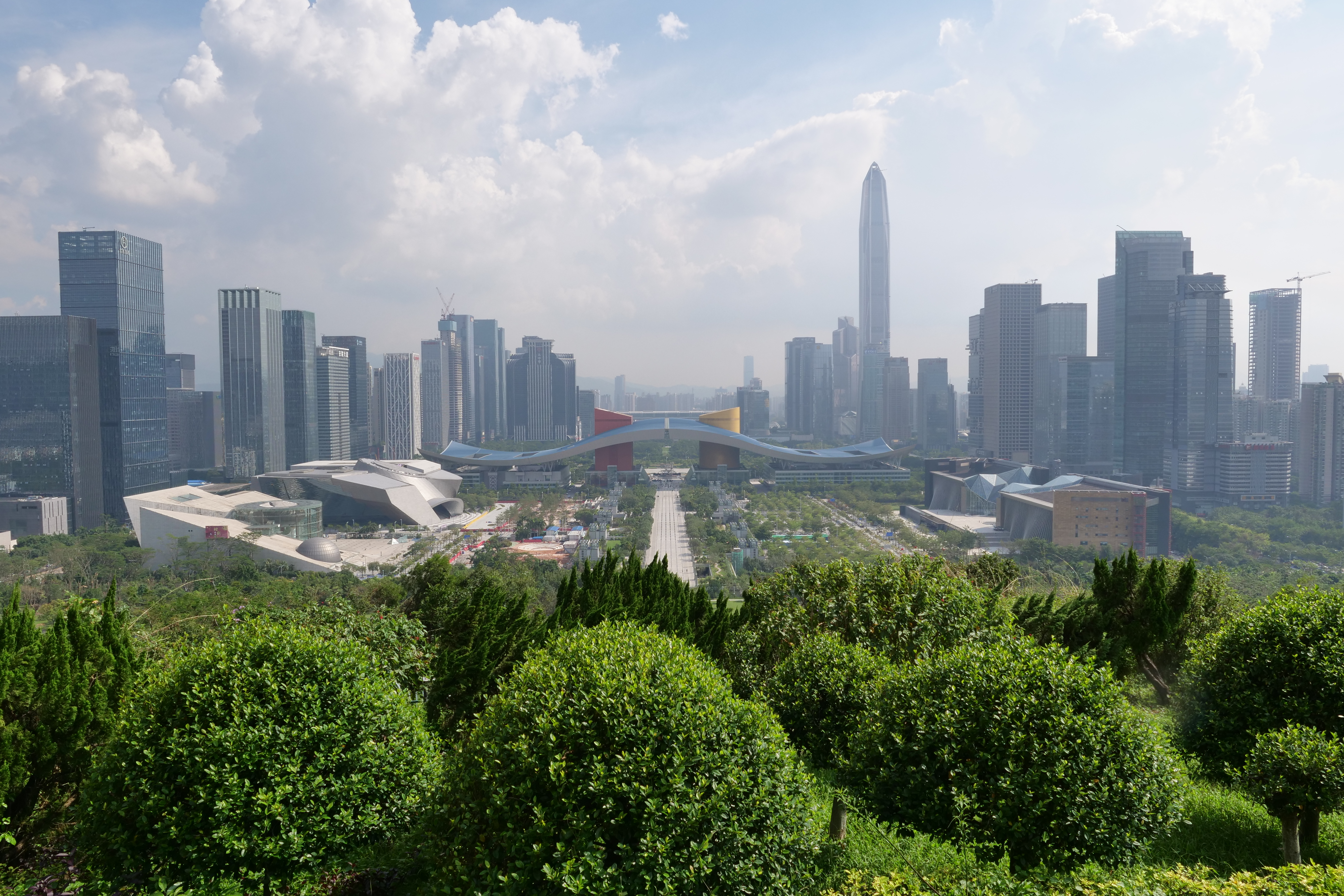
Shenzhen Civic Center

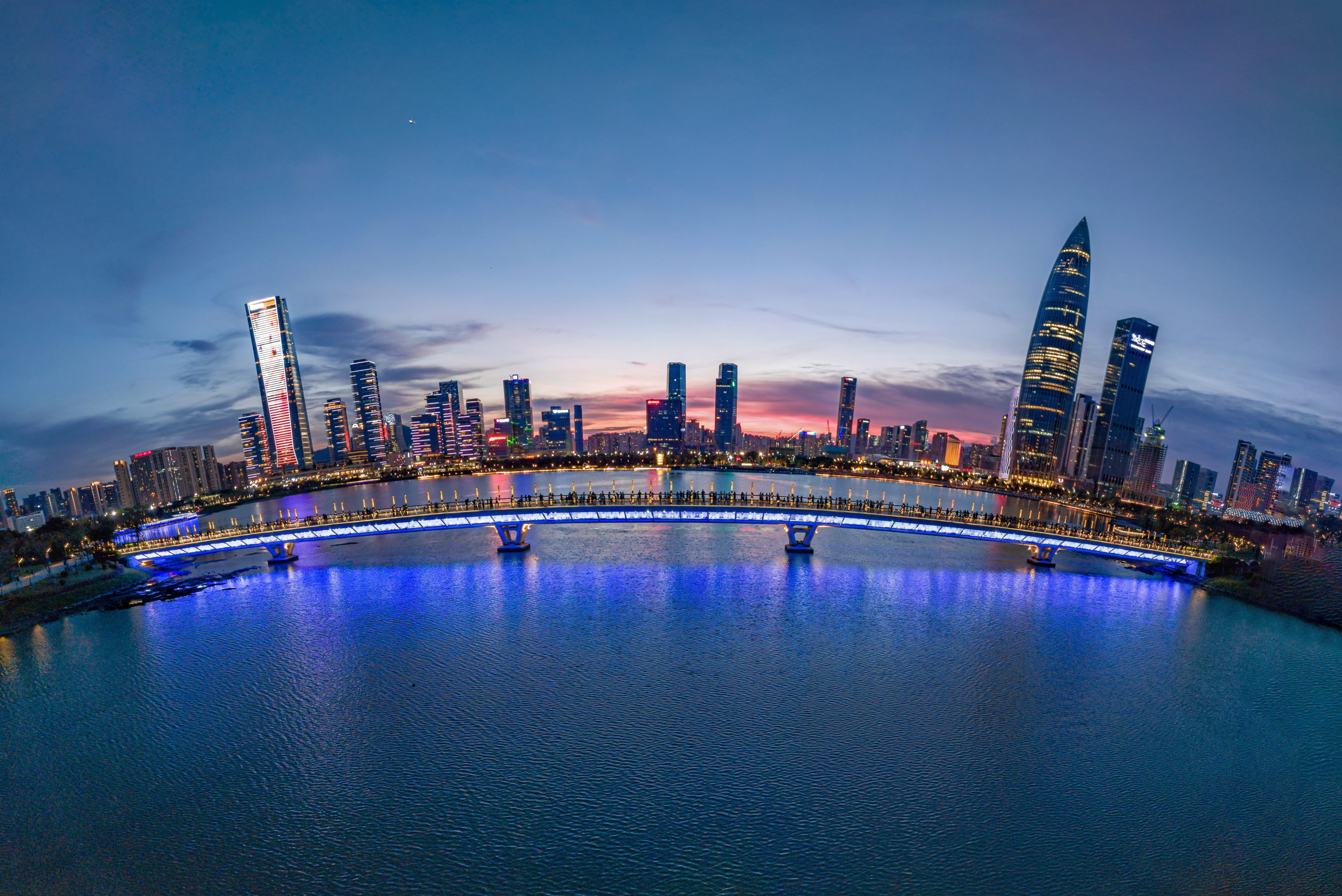
Night view of Shenzhen Bay

The Shenzhen speed (Chinese: 深圳速度) was a term originally used during the early stages of Reform and Opening Up period to describe the fast construction of Guomao Building in Shenzhen, China. Being the tallest building in China at the time, Guomao Building, constructed by China Construction Third Engineering Bureau Group Co. Ltd, boasts an efficient construction progress in which the completion of every storey took a mere three days.

The term has been used to describe the fast growth of Shenzhen as one of the first special economic zones of China, which has been called "China's Silicon Valley" and the "Instant City". Since 1979, Shenzhen has transformed from a small fishing village to be one of the world's most important technological hubs with one of the highest per-capita income levels in mainland China. In 1984 and 1992, Deng Xiaoping, then paramount leader of China and the "Chief Architect of Reform and Opening-up", made inspection tours to Shenzhen, endorsing the "Shenzhen speed" and the development model of the special economic zones.

== See also ==
- Shekou
- Yuan Geng
- Time is money, Efficiency is life
- Deng Xiaoping's Southern Tour
