= Reform and opening up =

Economic reforms in China since 1978

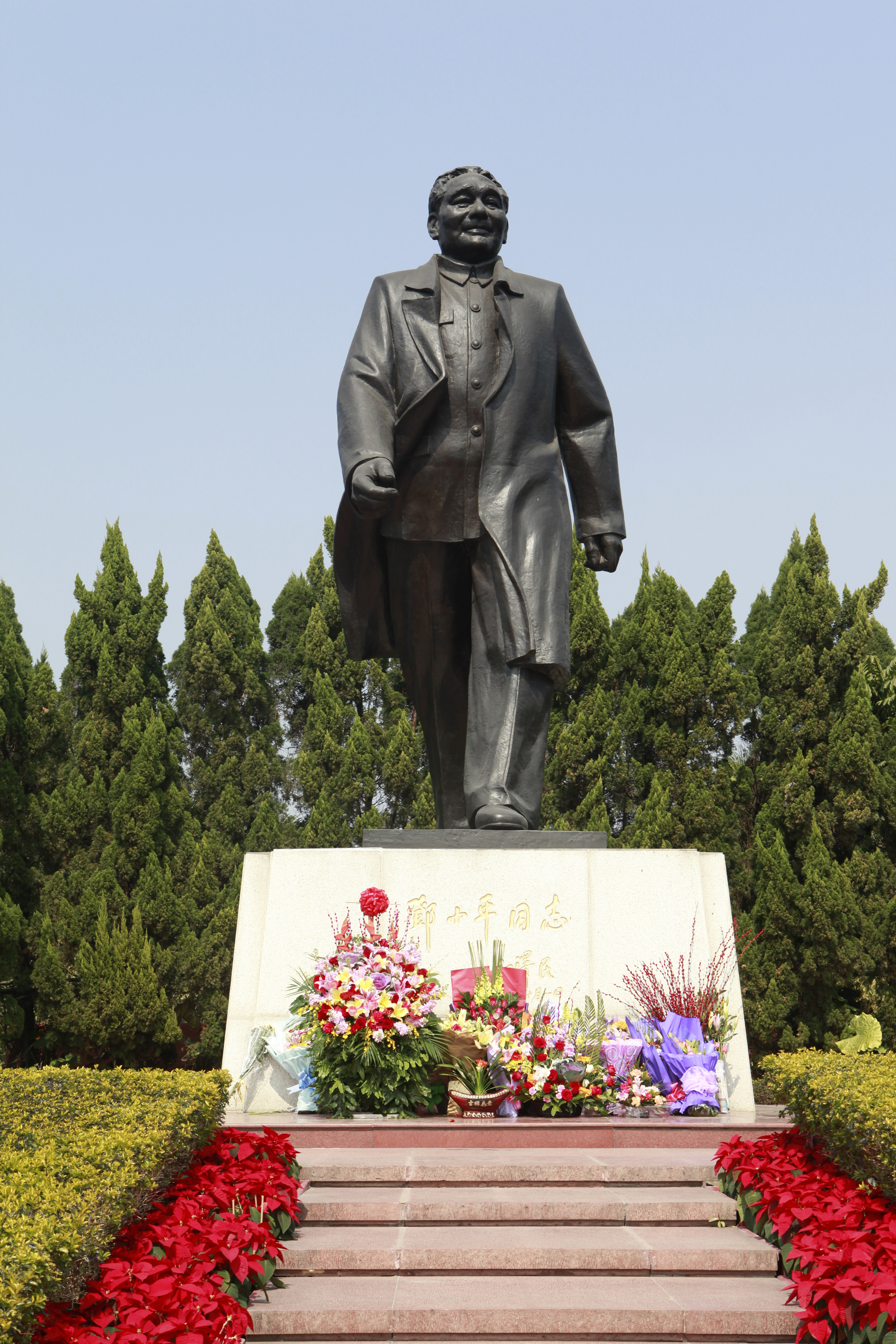
- Statue of Deng Xiaoping in Lianhuashan Park in Shenzhen
- Simplified Chinese: 改革开放
- Traditional Chinese: 改革開放
Transcriptions
Standard Mandarin
- Hanyu Pinyin: Gǎigé kāifàng
- Wade–Giles: Kai^{3}-ko^{2} k'ai^{1}-fang^{4}
- IPA: [kàɪkɤ̌ kʰáɪfâŋ]
Yue: Cantonese
- Yale Romanization: Góigaak hōifong
- Jyutping: Goi2-gaak3 hoi1-fong3
- IPA: [kɔj˧˥kak̚˧ hɔj˥fɔŋ˧]

Reform and opening-up, also known as the Chinese economic reform or Chinese Economic Miracle or Chinese Growth Miracle, is a variety of economic reforms in the People's Republic of China (PRC) that began in the late 20th century, after Mao Zedong's death in 1976.

Guided by Deng Xiaoping, who is often credited as the "General Architect", the reforms were launched by the ruling Chinese Communist Party (CCP) on December 18, 1978 at the third plenary session of the 11th CCP Central Committee, during the Boluan Fanzheng period. In 1979, Deng launched the Four Modernizations, aiming to modernize China's economy. A parallel set of political reforms were launched by Deng and his allies in the 1980s, but ended with the 1989 Tiananmen Square protests and massacre, halting further political liberalization. The economic reforms were revived after Deng Xiaoping's southern tour in 1992. Reform and opening up gradually became the main component of socialism with Chinese characteristics, constituting Deng Xiaoping Theory, and was incorporated into the CCP constitution in 1997 and written into the state constitution in 1999.

Reform and opening up is a major decision and turning point in the history of the People's Republic of China. It began after the Cultural Revolution, and changed the planned economic model of China to what is officially termed as a socialist market economy. The reforms de-collectivized agriculture, abolished the people's communes, relaxed price controls, allowed foreign direct investment into China, and led to the creation of special economic zones, most prominently the Shenzhen Special Economic Zone and the Shanghai Pudong New Area. Private enterprises were allowed to grow, while many state-owned enterprises were scaled down or privatized. Shanghai Stock Exchange and the Shenzhen Stock Exchange were established in 1990, allowing a capital market system, while China joined the Asia-Pacific Economic Cooperation in 1991 and the World Trade Organization in 2001.

The reforms led to significant economic growth for China within the successive decades; this phenomenon has since been seen as an "economic miracle". The reforms turned China from one of the poorest countries in the world to an upper-middle income country, while significantly reducing poverty and increasing wealth; between 1978 and 2018, China reduced extreme poverty by 800 million. The economic growth resulting from the reforms also significantly increased China's global political and economic power, while establishing the country as the world's leading manufacturing power. China's economy has grown from $150 billion in 1978 to $18.74 trillion by 2024. In 2010, China overtook Japan as the world's second-largest economy by nominal GDP, before overtaking the United States in 2016 as the world's largest economy by GDP (PPP).

== History of the reforms ==
The Chinese Communist Party (CCP) carried out the market reforms in two stages. The first stage, in the late 1970s and early 1980s, involved the de-collectivization of agriculture, the opening up of the country to foreign investment, and permission for entrepreneurs to start businesses. However, a large percentage of industries remained state-owned. The second stage of reform, in the late 1980s and 1990s, involved the privatization and contracting out of much state-owned industry. The 1985 lifting of price controls was a major reform, and the lifting of protectionist policies and regulations soon followed, although state monopolies in the commanding heights of the economy such as banking and petroleum remained.

In 2001, China joined the World Trade Organization (WTO). Not long after, the private sector grew remarkably, accounting for as much as 70 percent of China's gross domestic product (GDP) by 2005. From 1978 until 2013, significant growth occurred, with the economy increasing by 9.5% a year. Hu Jintao and Wen Jiabao's administration took a more conservative approach towards reforms, regulated and controlled the economy more heavily after 2005, reversing some reforms.

=== Origin ===
Before Deng Xiaoping's reforms, China's economy suffered due to centrally planned policies, such as the Great Leap Forward and the Cultural Revolution, resulting in stagnation, inefficiency, and poverty. Prior to the reforms, the Chinese economy was dominated by state ownership and central planning. From 1950 to 1973, Chinese real GDP per capita grew at a rate of 2.9% per year on average, albeit with major fluctuations. This placed it near the middle of the Asian nations during the same period, with neighboring countries such as Japan, South Korea, Singapore and then rival Chiang Kai-shek's Republic of China (ROC) outstripping mainland China's rate of growth. Starting in 1970, the economy entered into a period of stagnation, and after the death of Mao Zedong, the CCP leadership decided to abandon Maoism and turn to market-oriented reforms to salvage the stagnant economy. In September 1976, Mao Zedong died, and in October, Hua Guofeng together with Ye Jianying and Wang Dongxing arrested the Gang of Four, putting an end to the Cultural Revolution. Hua's break with Cultural Revolution era economic policies were consistent with the 1975 reform agenda of Deng Xiaoping. Hua made national economic development a matter of the highest priority and emphasized the need to achieve "liberation of productive forces". He "combined Soviet-style big push industrialization with an opening up to the capitalist world" and under his leadership, China opened its first Special Economic Zone and launched major efforts to attract foreign direct investment.

Economic reforms began in earnest during the "Boluan Fanzheng" period, especially after Deng and his reformist allies rose to power with Deng replacing Hua Guofeng as the paramount leader in December 1978. By the time Deng took power, there was widespread support among the elite for economic reforms. From 1978 to 1992, Deng described reform and opening up as a "large scale experiment" requiring thorough "experimentation in practice" instead of textbook knowledge. As the de facto leader, Deng's policies faced opposition from party conservatives but were extremely successful in increasing the country's wealth. Major reforms (including rural decollectivization, SOE reform, and rural health care reform) almost always began first as decentralized local experiments subject to intervention from high level Communist Party officials before they were more widely adopted.

=== 1979–1984 ===
In 1979, Deng Xiaoping emphasized the goal of "Four Modernizations" and further proposed the idea of moderately prosperous society. The achievements of Lee Kuan Yew to create an economic success in Singapore had a profound effect on the CCP leadership in China. Leaders in China made a major effort, especially under Deng Xiaoping, to emulate his policies of economic growth, entrepreneurship, and subtle suppression of dissent. Over the years, more than 22,000 Chinese officials were sent to Singapore to study its methods.

Generally, reforms in this period started with local experiments that were adopted and expanded elsewhere once their success had been demonstrated. Officials generally faced few penalties for experimenting and failing and those who developed successful programs received nation-wide praise and recognition. The bottom-up approach of the reforms promoted by Deng, in contrast to the top-down approach of the Perestroika in the Soviet Union, is considered an important factor contributing to the success of China's economic transition.

The first reforms began in agriculture. By the late 1970s, food supplies and production had become so deficient that government officials were warning that China was about to repeat the "disaster of 1959", the famines which killed tens of millions during the Great Leap Forward. Deng responded by decollectivizing agriculture and emphasizing the household-responsibility system, which divided the land of the people's communes into private plots. Under the new policy, peasants were able to exercise formal control of their land as long as they sold a contracted portion of their crops to the government. This move increased agricultural production by 25 percent between 1975 and 1985, setting a precedent for privatizing other parts of the economy.

Reforms were also implemented in urban industry to increase productivity. A dual-price system was introduced, in which (State-owned enterprise reform 1979) state-owned industries were allowed to sell any production above the plan quota, and commodities were sold at both plan and market prices, allowing citizens to avoid the shortages of the Maoist era. Moreover, the adoption of Industrial Responsibility System 1980s further promote the development of state-owned enterprise by allowing individuals or groups to manage the enterprise by contract. Private businesses were allowed to operate for the first time since the CCP takeover, and they gradually began to make up a greater percentage of industrial output. Price flexibility was also increased, expanding the service sector.

At the same time, in December 1978, Deng announced a new policy, the Open Door Policy, to open the door to foreign businesses that wanted to set up in China. For the first time since the Kuomintang era, the country was opened to foreign investment. Deng created a series of Special Economic Zones, including Shenzhen, Zhuhai and Xiamen, for foreign investment that were relatively free of the bureaucratic regulations and interventions that hampered economic growth. These regions became engines of growth for the national economy. On January 31, 1979, the Shekou Industrial Zone of Shenzhen was founded, becoming the first experimental area in China to "open up".

In July 1979, China adopted its first Law on Joint Venture Using Chinese and Foreign Investment. This law was effective in helping to attract and absorb foreign technology and capital from advanced countries like the United States, facilitated China's exports to such countries, and thereby contributed to China's subsequent rapid economic growth. In 1980, In alignment with Deng's pragmatism, he praised and substantially improved the reputation of Qing official Qishan, who was formerly criticised for his pragmatic approach against the British in the First Opium War.

The 1981 Several Decisions on Finding New Ways, Developing the Economy and Solving the Problem of Unemployment in the Cities described individually-owned businesses as "a necessary supplement to socialist state-owned businesses".

Under the leadership of Yuan Geng, the "Shekou model" of development was gradually formed, embodied in its famous slogan Time is Money, Efficiency is Life, which then widely spread to other parts of China. In January 1984, Deng Xiaoping made his first inspection tour to Shenzhen and Zhuhai, praising the "Shenzhen speed" of development as well as the success of the special economics zones.

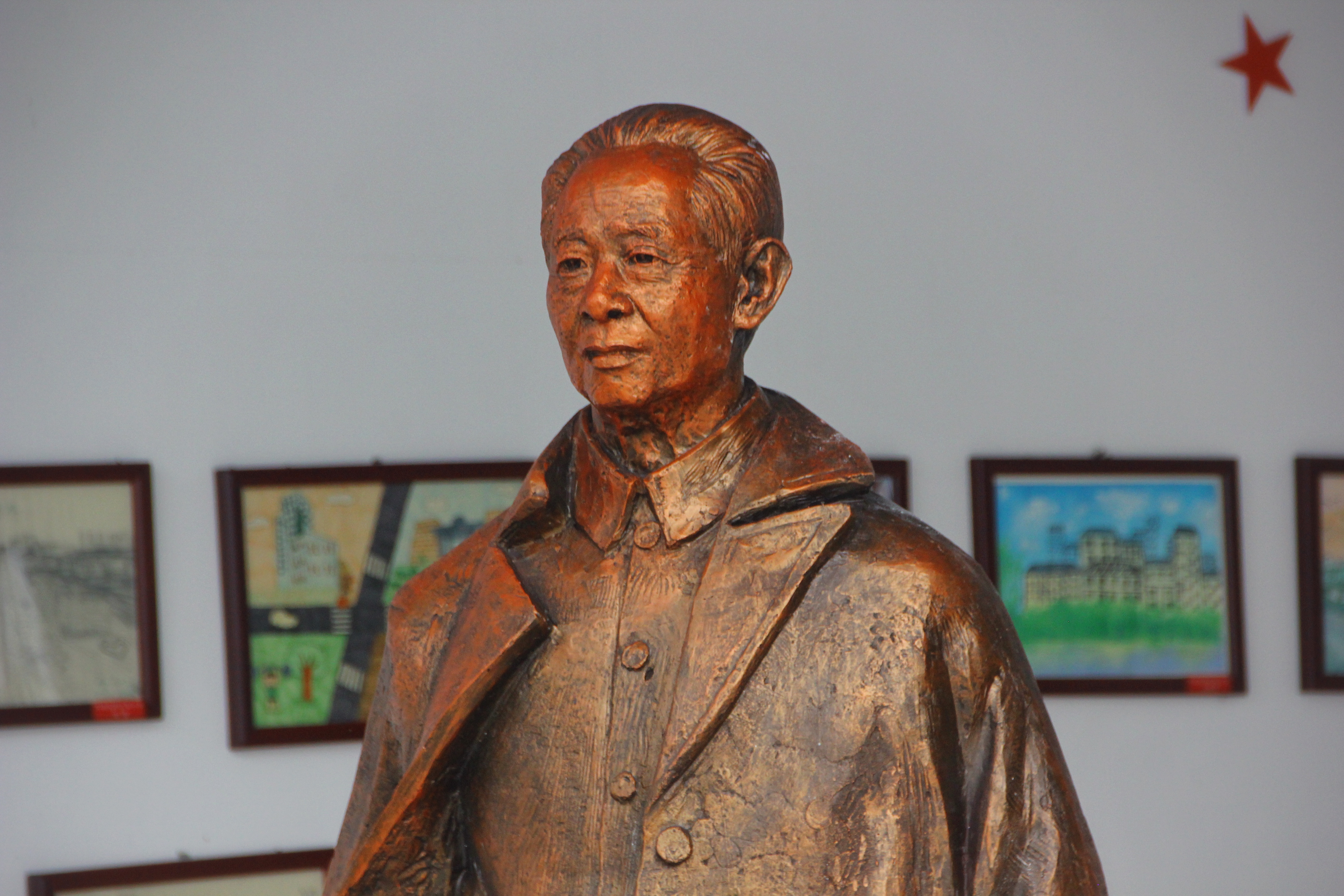
Hu Yaobang, then General Secretary of CCP, played an important role in implementing the reforms together with Zhao Ziyang, then Premier of China.

Besides Deng Xiaoping himself, important high-ranking reformists who helped carry out the reforms include Hu Yaobang, then General Secretary of Chinese Communist Party, and Zhao Ziyang, then Premier of China. Other leaders who favored Deng's reforms include Xi Zhongxun (the father of Xi Jinping), Wan Li, Hu Qili and others. Another influential leader was Chen Yun, regarded by some as the second most powerful person in China after Deng with more conservative ideology of the reforms. Though Deng Xiaoping is credited as the architect of modern China's economic reforms, Chen was more directly involved in the details of its planning and construction, and led a force that opposed many of the reforms from Deng's side. The two sides struggled over the general direction of the reforms until Chen died in 1995. A key feature of Chen's ideas was to use the market to allocate resources, within the scope of an overall plan. Some reforms of the early 1980s were, in effect, the implementation of a program that Chen had outlined in the mid-1950s. Chen called this the "birdcage economy". According to Chen, "the cage is the plan, and it may be large or small. But within the cage the bird [the economy] is free to fly as he wishes." Chen and some other conservative leaders including Li Xiannian never visited Shenzhen, the leading special economic zone championed by Deng.

=== 1984–1993 ===
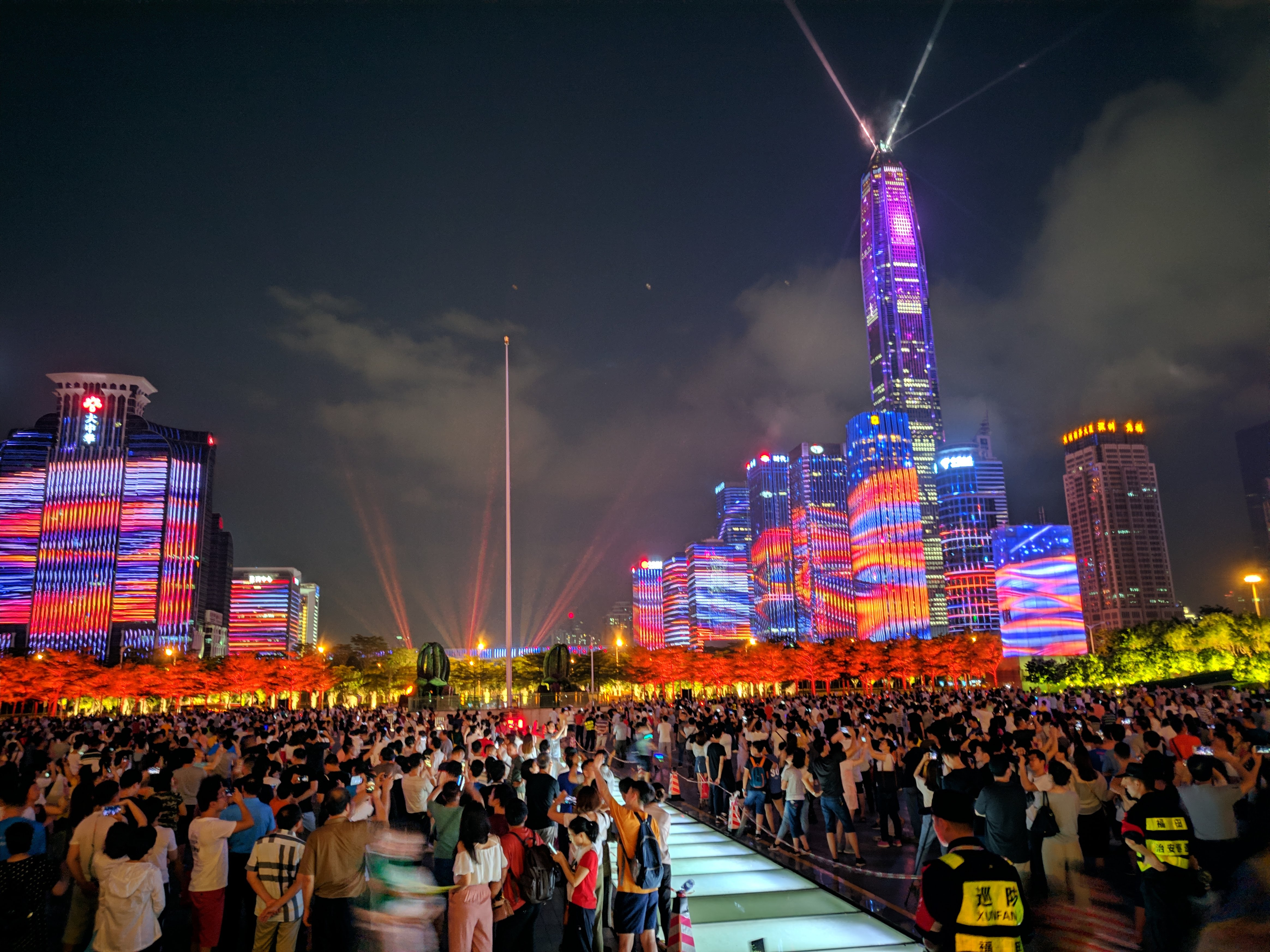
Shenzhen, one of the first special economic zones of China and the "Silicon Valley of China". Notable high-tech companies such as Huawei, ZTE and Konka were all founded in Shenzhen in the 1980s.

In October 1984, the Party adopted its Decision on the Reform of the Economic System, marking a major shift in the thinking of Chinese policymakers with regard to market mechanisms. The Decision acknowledged that a planned economy was not the only way to develop socialism and that prior policies restricting the commodity economy had hindered socialist development. After the Decision, reform focused on building a socialist planned commodity economy with Chinese characteristics.

Controls on private businesses and government intervention continued to decrease, notably in the agrifood sector which saw relaxation of price controls in 1985 and the establishment of the household responsibility system, and there was small-scale privatization of state enterprises which had become unviable. A notable development was the decentralization of state control, leaving local provincial leaders to experiment with ways to increase economic growth and privatize the state sector. Township and village enterprises, firms nominally owned by local governments but effectively private, began to gain market share at the expense of the state sector. With the help of Yuan Geng, the first joint-stock commercial bank in China, the China Merchants Bank, and the first joint-stock insurance company in China, the Ping An Insurance, were both established in Shekou. In May 1984, fourteen coastal cities in China including Shanghai, Guangzhou and Tianjin were named "Open Coastal Cities (沿海开放城市)".

In 1985, a dual-track price system was adopted, in which the price of commodities within the planning system were set by the state while the prices of commodities outside it were set by market systems. A significant economic debate during this period concerned the approach to price liberalization and whether China should adopt an approach consistent with shock therapy—sudden price liberalization – or a more gradual approach. But in 1986, the latter approach won out. "Confronted with the diverse, authoritative warnings about the unforeseeable risks of imposing the shock of price reform and the uncertainty about its benefits," Premier Zhao Ziyang and the leadership ultimately rejected shock price reform. Zhao had accepted the argument that the basic concern in economic reform was energizing enterprises. By late summer, what started under the rubric of "coordinated comprehensive package reform" had been diluted to an adjustment in the price of steel (although its price was both important had carried symbolic weight) as well as partial tax and financial reform. Radical price reform again became a focus in 1988, leading to an attempted price reform, and this time led to spiraling inflation (the first time it had done so since the 1940s) as well as a backlash that included local protests, bank runs, and panic buying. The Chinese leadership halted these price liberalization plans in fall 1988 and instead focused on austerity, price reform, and retrenchment.

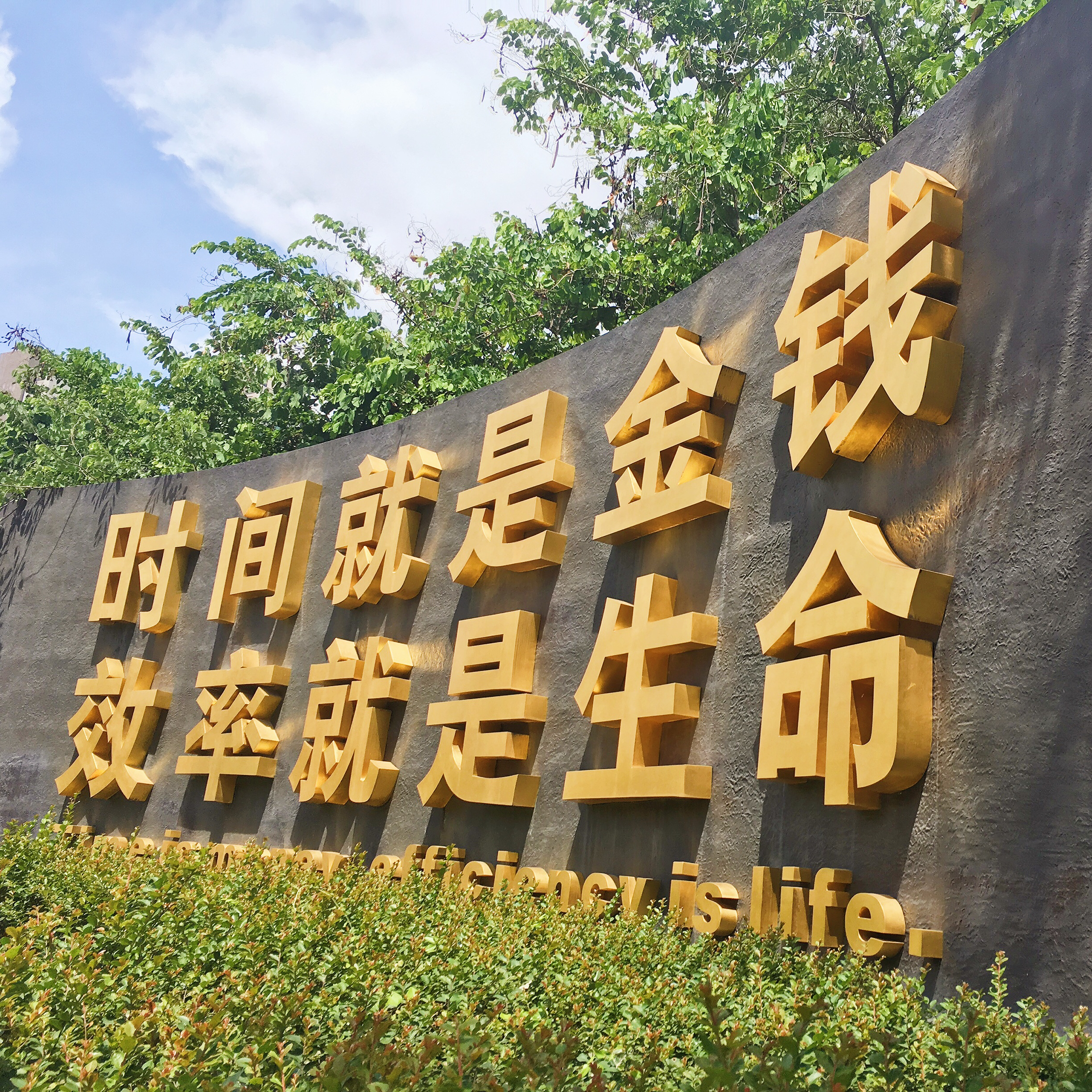
The slogan "Time is Money, Efficiency is Life" from Shekou, Shenzhen, representing the "Shenzhen speed"

Corruption and increased inflation increased discontent, contributing to the 1989 Tiananmen Square protests and massacre and a conservative backlash after that event which ousted several key reformers and threatened to reverse many of Deng's reforms. The events of 1988 and 1989 led to the imprisonment or exile of many reformist officials. However, Deng stood by his reforms and in 1992, he affirmed the need to continue reforms in his southern tour. Thanks to his encouragement, in November 1990 the Shanghai Stock Exchange was reopened after being closed by Mao 40 years earlier, while the Shenzhen Stock Exchange was also founded in December 1990.

In contrast to the approach of Deng, conservative elders led by Chen Yun called to strike a balance between too much laissez-faire market economy and retaining state control over key areas of the economy. Chen Yun helped preserve the economy by preventing policies that would have damaged the interests of special interest groups in the government bureaucracy.

Although the economy grew quickly during this period, economic troubles in the inefficient state sector increased. Heavy losses had to be made up by state revenues and acted as a drain upon the economy. Inflation became problematic in 1985, 1988 and 1992. Privatizations began to accelerate after 1992, and the private sector grew as a percentage of GDP. China's government slowly expanded recognition of the private economy, first as a "complement" to the state sector (1988) and then as an "important component" (1999) of the socialist market economy.

=== 1993–2005 ===
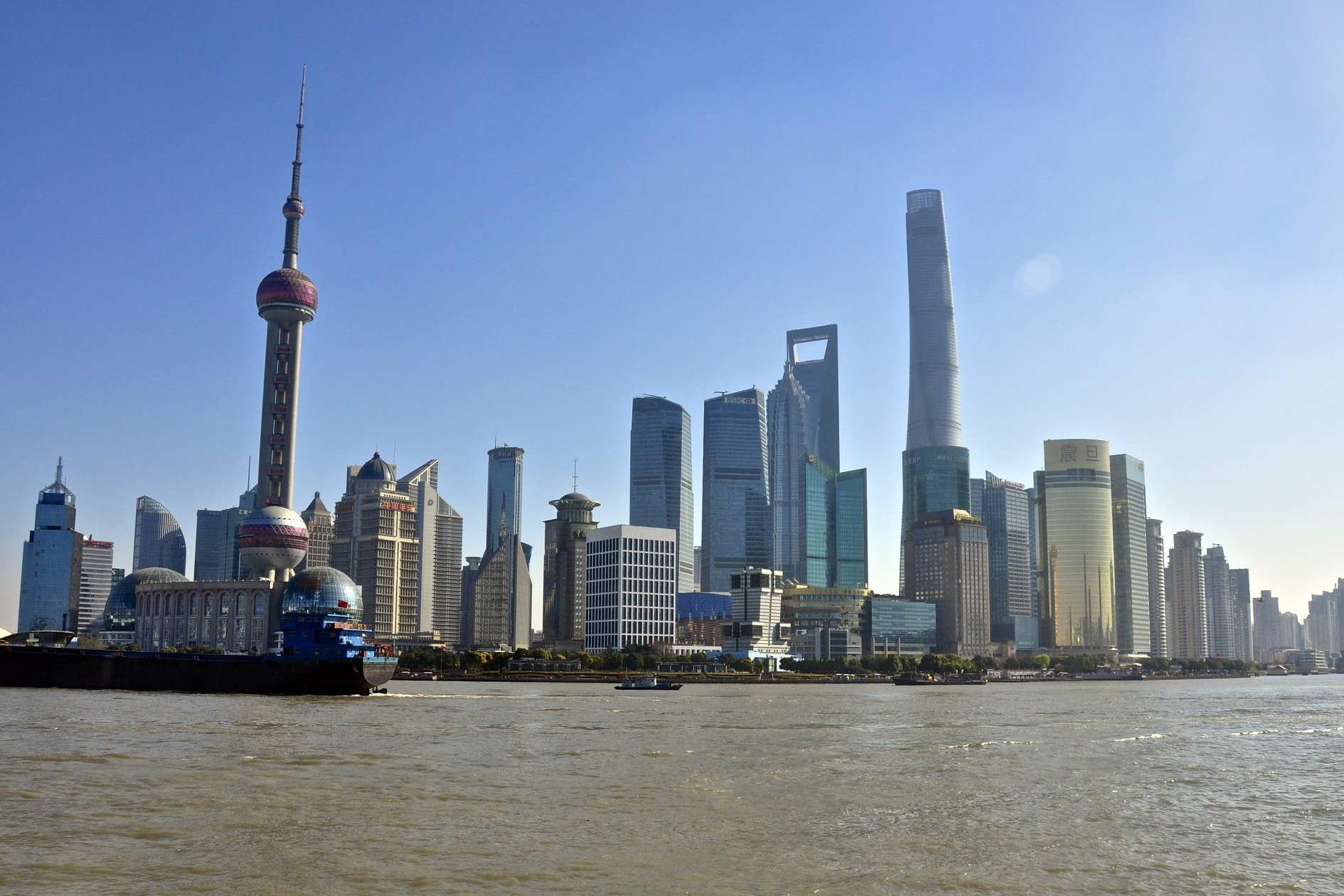
The Lujiazui financial district of Pudong, Shanghai, the financial and commercial hub of modern China

In the 1990s, Deng allowed many radical reforms to be carried out. Deng also elevated reformer Zhu Rongji from Party secretary of Shanghai to Vice Premier in 1991, and later into Politburo Standing Committee in 1992. In 1993, the National People's Congress adopted the landmark Corporation Law. It provides that in state owned enterprises, the state is no more than an investor and controller of stock and assets. Pursuant to the Corporation Law, private and foreign investment in such enterprises must be below 49%. The law also permitted state firms to declare bankruptcy in the event of business failure.

In the beginning, Chen supported Deng, carried out and implemented many of the influential reforms that made a generation of Chinese richer. But later, Chen realized that the state still needed an active iron hand involvement in the market to prevent the private sector from becoming untamable. Chen's criticism of Deng's later economic reforms was widely influential within the CCP and was reflected in the policies of China's leaders after Deng. Chen's theories supported the efforts of Jiang Zemin and Hu Jintao to use state power to provide boundaries for the operation of the market, and to mediate the damage that capitalism can do to those who find it difficult to benefit from the free market. Chen's notion of the CPC as a "ruling party" was central to the redefinition of the role of the Party in Jiang Zemin's Three Represents. In 2005, on the occasion of the hundredth anniversary of Chen's birth, the Party press published, over the course of several weeks, the proceedings of a symposium discussing Chen's contributions to CCP history, theory and practice.

Although Deng died in 1997, reforms continued under his handpicked successors, Jiang Zemin and Zhu Rongji, who were ardent reformers who also abided by Chen Yun advice to keep the reforms steady and keep the state still in charge of key areas. In 1997 and 1998, large-scale privatization occurred, in which all state enterprises, except a few large monopolies, were liquidated and their assets sold to private investors. Between 2001 and 2004, the number of state-owned enterprises decreased by 48 percent. During the same period, Jiang and Zhu also reduced tariffs, trade barriers, and regulations; reformed the banking system; dismantled much of the Mao-era social welfare system; forced the Chinese army (PLA) to divest itself of military-run businesses; reduced inflation; and joined the World Trade Organization. These moves invoked discontent among some groups, especially laid-off workers of state enterprises that had been privatized.

The domestic private sector first exceeded 50% of GDP in 2005 and has further expanded since. Also in 1999, China was able to surpass Japan as the largest economy in Asia by purchasing power parity (PPP) values. However, some state monopolies still remained, such as in petroleum and banking.

=== 2005–2012 ===
CCP general secretary Hu Jintao and premier Wen Jiabao took a more conservative approach towards reforms, and began to reverse some of Deng Xiaoping's reforms in 2005. Observers note that the government adopted more egalitarian and populist policies. It increased subsidies and control over the health care sector, increased funding for education, halted privatization, and adopted a loose monetary policy, which led to the formation of a U.S.-style property bubble in which property prices tripled. The privileged state sector was the primary recipient of government investment, which, under the new administration, promoted the rise of large "national champions" which could compete with large foreign corporations. Nevertheless, the share of SOEs in the total number of companies have continued to fall, dropping to 5%, though their share of total output remained at 26%. Exchange rates for the yuan were also liberalized and the peg to the U.S. dollar was broken, leading the yuan to rise by 31% against the dollar from 2005 to 2012. China's economic growth has averaged around 10% under Hu, while the economy surpassed the United Kingdom, France, Germany and Japan.

=== 2012–2020 ===
Under CCP general secretary Xi Jinping and his administration, the CCP has sought numerous reforms, with the Third Plenum of the 18th Central Committee announcing that "market forces" would begin to play a "decisive" role in allocating resources. Xi launched the Shanghai Free-Trade Zone in August 2013, seen as part of the reforms. He has additionally voiced support for SOEs, and under him, at least 288 firms have revised their corporate charters by 2017 to allow the CCP greater influence in corporate management, and to reflect the party line. This trend also includes Hong Kong listed firms, who have traditionally downplayed their party links, but are now "redrafting bylaws to formally establish party committees that previously existed only at the group level." In other dimensions, according to Ray Dalio, the Xi era has also been marked by economic opening, greater market-oriented decision-making and discontinuation of support for poorly managed state-owned enterprises.

Xi has increased the power of CCP bodies in economic decision-making, decreasing the influence of the State Council and the premier. His administration made it easier for banks to issue mortgages, increased foreign participation in the bond market, and increased the national currency renminbi's global role, helping it to join IMF's basket of special drawing right. His administration has also pursued a debt-deleveraging campaign, seeking to slow and cut the unsustainable amount of debt China has accrued during its economic growth.

Xi's administration has also reoriented the economy to increase self-reliance, and accordingly launched two campaigns; Made in China 2025 and China Standards 2035, which have sought to scale up and displace U.S. dominance in various high-tech sectors, though publicly China de-emphasized these plans due to the outbreak of a trade war with the U.S. in 2018. This is alongside more aggressive pursuit of trade policies, in line with an outlook that sees China move towards taking a more active role in writing the rules of trade. The 19th Party National Congress in 2017 declared that China and the CCP entered a "new era of socialism with Chinese characteristics" in 2012, which it said was both consistent with and significantly different from the past nearly 40 years of reform and opening up.

Some analysts have also added that the reform era has been scaled down significantly during the leadership of Xi when the reformists lost power, citing that Xi has reasserted state control over different aspects of Chinese society, including the economy.

=== 2020–present ===
Xi has circulated a policy called dual circulation, meaning reorienting the economy towards domestic consumption while remaining open to foreign trade and investment. Since 2021, his administration has formulated the three red lines policy that aimed to deleverage the heavily indebted property sector.

In September 2020, the CCP announced that it would strengthen United Front work in the private sector by establishing more party committees in the regional federations of industry and commerce (FIC), and by arranging a special liaison between FIC and the CCP.

Since 2021, Xi has promoted the term common prosperity, a term which he defined as an "essential requirement of socialism", described as affluence for all and said entailed reasonable adjustments to excess incomes. Common prosperity has been used as the justification for large-scale crackdowns and regulations towards the perceived "excesses" of several sectors, most prominently tech and tutoring industries.

== Ideologies of the reforms ==
During the Boluan Fanzheng period, Deng Xiaoping and Hu Yaobang launched the large-scale 1978 Truth Criterion Discussion and endorsed the ideology of "practice is the sole criterion for testing truth". The truth criterion discussion successfully helped Deng's reformist ideology win against Hua Guofeng's governing philosophy Two Whatevers ("Whatever Chairman Mao said, we will say and whatever Chairman Mao did, we will do"), and as a result Deng replaced Hua as the new paramount leader of China at the 3rd plenary session of the 11th Central Committee of the CCP in December 1978, when the "Reform and Opening" of China officially began. At the same time, the truth criterion discussion also triggered the New Enlightenment movement in mainland China which lasted over a decade, promoting democracy, humanism and universal values such as human rights and freedom. The "thought liberation" encouraged by the Chinese government, though bounded by the Four Cardinal Principles proposed by Deng in 1979, subsequently became the bedrock for the reforms. Planned economy as well as the Maoist policies imposed during the Cultural Revolution were gradually dismantled, and the theory of a primary stage of socialism was proposed as the theoretical basis of the political report to the 13th National Congress of the CCP held in 1987.

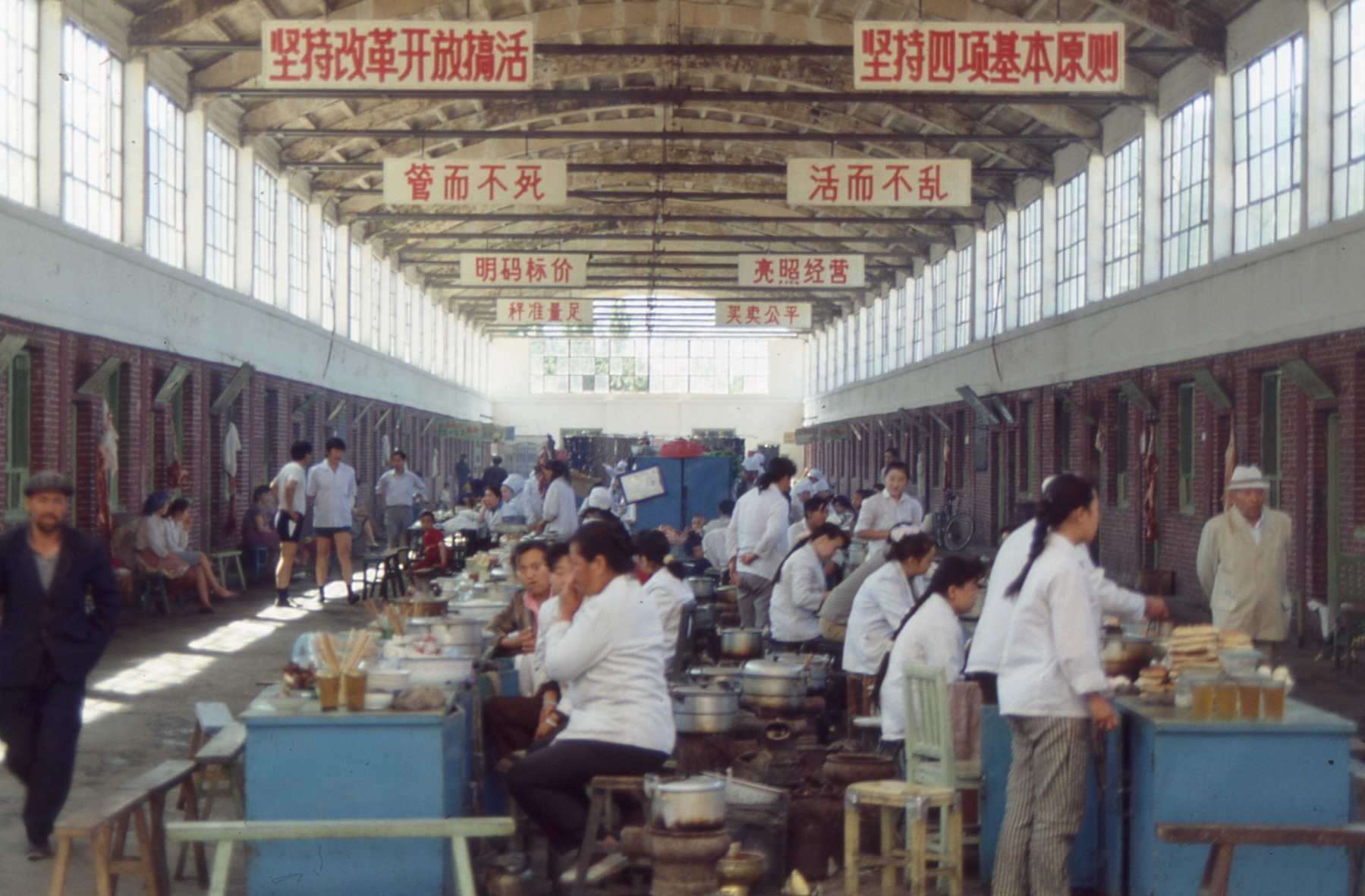
A market in Kashgar, Xinjiang in 1992, with a slogan on the left saying "adhere to Reform and Opening" and a slogan on the right saying "uphold the Four Cardinal Principles".

However, the 1989 Tiananmen Square protests and massacre ended both the political reforms and the New Enlightenment movement in China, sending the overall "Reform and Opening" program into stagnation. Between 1989 and 1992, there were fears and concerns within the CCP that further reforms may turn China into a capitalist country, and the CCP new leadership under general secretary Jiang Zemin shifted its focus to preventing the Peaceful Evolution from the West. This was especially true after the Revolutions of 1989 in Europe and around the time of the dissolution of the Soviet Union in 1991. In early 1992, then retired paramount leader Deng Xiaoping embarked on his celebrated southern tour, during which he, with strong support from the Chinese military, ordered that "those who do not promote reform should be brought down from their leadership positions". Deng dissuaded people from debating over whether China was on a capitalist or socialist path, calling that "development is of overriding importance"; his pragmatic remarks reignited people's enthusiasm for economic reforms in mainland China, therefore resuming the "Reform and Opening" program. Subsequently, Deng's cat theory ("I don't care if the cat is black or white, so long as it catches mice") became an underlying ideology guiding the economic reforms, as a cornerstone of the socialism with Chinese characteristics and Deng Xiaoping Theory. Globally, China's reforms directly influenced the reform policies in Vietnam (Đổi Mới) and Laos, whereas North Korea saw China's reforms as a source of political instability and social unrest, accusing China of following a revisionist path.

Meanwhile, the New Enlightenment in the 1980s did not proceed, as the academia and intellectual circle in mainland China became divided in the 1990s, forming two major schools of thought: the Liberalism and the New Left. The Liberalism school argued that China should continue its reform and opening, further developing market economy while pushing forward political reforms for human rights, freedom, democracy, rule of law and constitutionalism; high-ranking Chinese officials including Premier Zhu Rongji and Premier Wen Jiabao have expressed various degree of support over this view. On the other hand, the New Left argued that capitalism had become prevalent in mainland China with worsening corruption and widening economic inequality, which were common issues in the development of western capitalism, and therefore the New Left criticizes market mechanism and calls for social justice as well as equality, defending some of Mao Zedong's policies during the Cultural Revolution. The large-scale Xiagang (下岗) layoffs of the late 1990s, in which tens of millions of SOE workers lost stable employment and experienced steep decline in social status, became a central example for New Left's critique. For these thinkers, xiagang symbolized how marketization is responsible for corruption and disparity, and the betrayal of socialist-era guarantees of welfare and job security. Other schools of thought such as the neoauthoritarianism school also exist, and some scholars have also proposed the "China Model" of development.

== Effects of the reforms ==
=== Economic performance ===
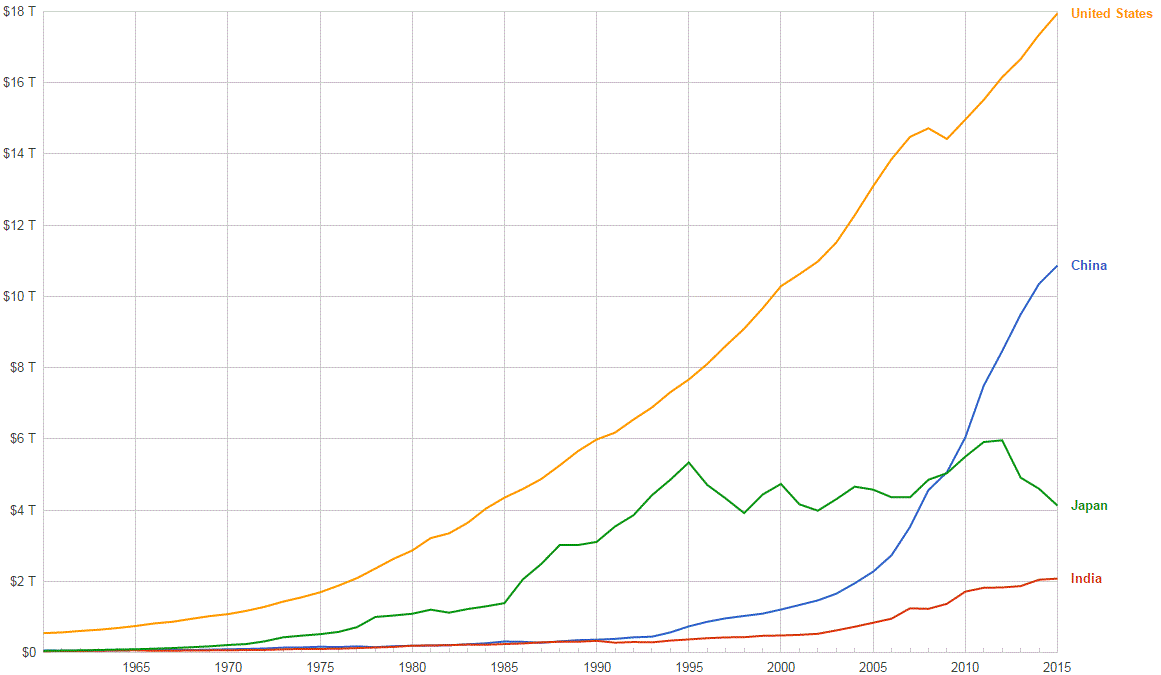
China's nominal GDP trend from 1952 to 2015.

The success of China's economic policies and the manner of their implementation resulted in immense changes in Chinese society in the last 40 years, including greatly decreased poverty while both average incomes and income inequality have increased, leading to a backlash led by the more ideologically pure New Left. Between 1978 and 2018, China reduced extreme poverty by 800 million.Scholars have debated the reason for the success of the Chinese "dual-track" economy, and have compared it to attempts to reform socialism in the Eastern Bloc and the Soviet Union; as well as to the growth of other developing economies. Additionally, these series of reforms have led to China's status as a great power and a shift of international geopolitical interests towards China, especially in matters relating to the ambiguous political status of Taiwan.

After three decades of reform, China's economy experienced one of the world's biggest booms. Agriculture and light industry have largely been privatized, while the state still retains control over some heavy industries. Despite the dominance of state ownership in finance, telecommunications, petroleum and other important sectors of the economy, private entrepreneurs continue to expand into sectors formerly reserved for public enterprise. Prices have also been liberalized.

China's economic growth since the reform has been very rapid, exceeding the East Asian Tigers. Since the beginning of Deng Xiaoping's reforms, China's GDP has grew from $150 billion in 1978 to $18.74 trillion by 2024. The increase in total factor productivity (TFP) was the most important factor, with productivity accounting for 40.1% of the GDP increase, compared with a decline of 13.2% for the period 1957 to 1978—the height of Maoist policies. For the period 1978–2005, Chinese GDP per capita increased from 2.7% to 15.7% of U.S. GDP per capita, and from 53.7% to 188.5% of Indian GDP per capita. Per capita incomes grew at 6.6% a year. Average wages rose sixfold between 1978 and 2005, while absolute poverty declined from 41% of the population to 5% from 1978 to 2001. Some scholars believed that China's economic growth has been understated, due to large sectors of the economy not being counted.

=== Impact on world growth ===
China is widely seen as an engine of world and regional growth. Surges in Chinese demand account for 50, 44 and 66 percent of export growth of Hong Kong, Japan and Taiwan respectively, and China's trade deficit with the rest of East Asia helped to revive the economies of Japan and Southeast Asia. Asian leaders view China's economic growth as an "engine of growth for all Asia".

=== Effect on inequality ===
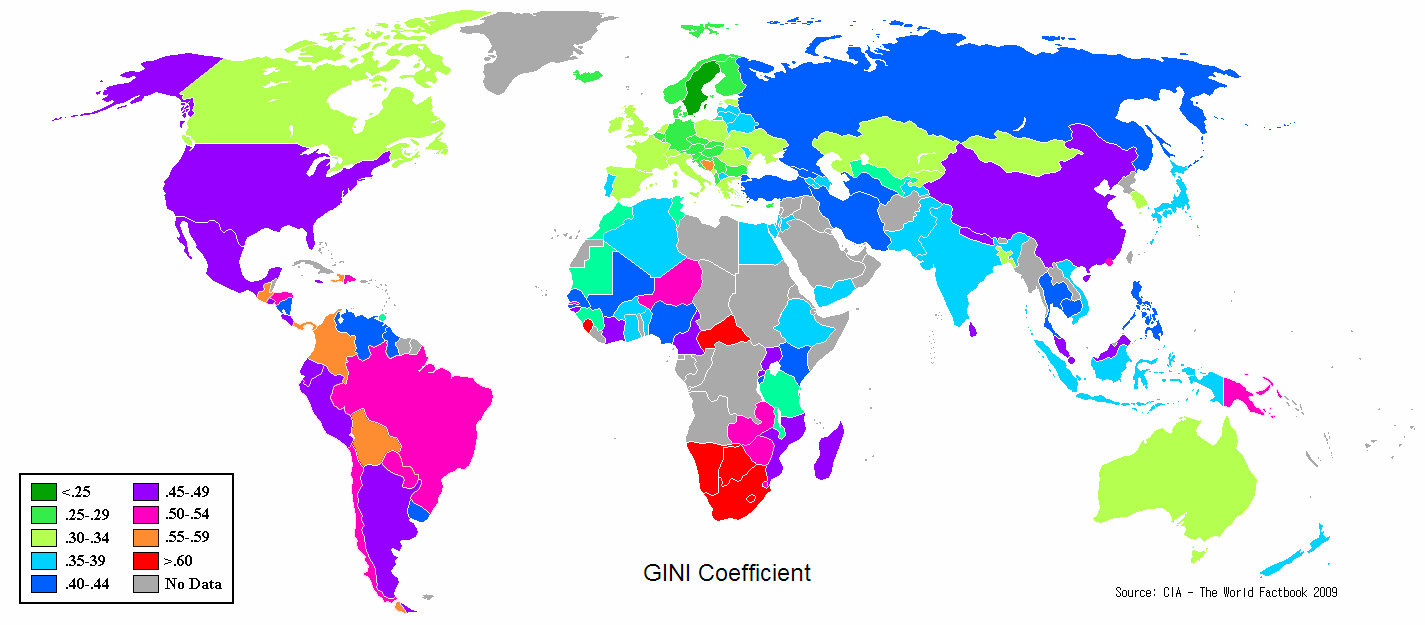
Gini-coefficient of national income distribution around the world (dark green: <0.25, red: >0.60)

Although the economic reforms has caused significant economic growth in China, it has also caused increased inequality, resulting in backlash and an attempt at pushing back the reforms by the Chinese New Left faction. Despite rapid economic growth which has virtually eliminated poverty in urban China and reduced it greatly in rural regions and the fact that living standards for everyone in China have drastically increased in comparison to the pre-reform era, the Gini coefficient of China is estimated to be above 0.45, comparable to some Latin American countries such as Argentina and Mexico as well as the United States.

Increased inequality is attributed to the gradual withdrawal of the welfare state system in China and differences between coastal and interior provinces, the latter being burdened by a larger state sector. Some Western scholars have suggested that reviving the welfare state and instituting a re-distributive income tax system is needed to relieve inequality, while some Chinese economists have suggested that privatizing state monopolies and distributing the proceeds to the population can reduce inequality.

== Reforms in specific sectors ==
=== Agriculture ===
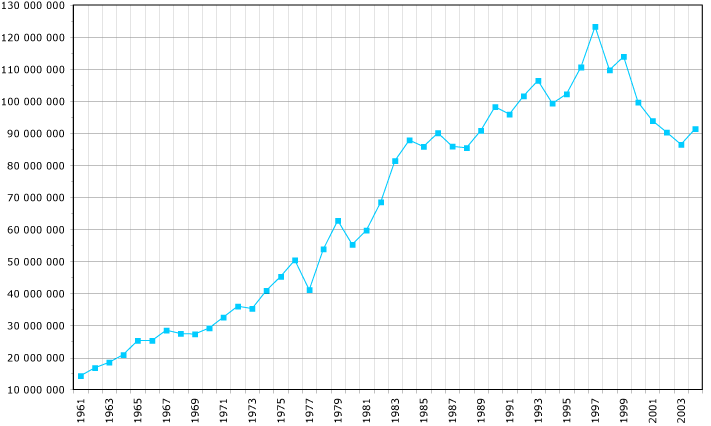
Production of wheat from 1961 to 2004. Data from FAO, year 2005. Y-axis: Production in metric ton.

During the pre-reform period, Chinese agricultural performance was average and food shortages were common. After Deng Xiaoping implemented the household responsibility system, agricultural output increased by 8.2% a year, compared with 2.7% in the pre-reform period, despite a decrease in the area of land used. Food prices fell nearly 50%, while agricultural incomes rose.

Zhao Ziyang wrote in his memoirs that in the years following the household contracting system, "the energy that was unleashed … was magical, beyond what anyone could have imagined. A problem thought to be unsolvable had worked itself out in just a few years time … [B]y 1984, farmers actually had more grain than they could sell. The state grain storehouses were stacked full from the annual procurement program."

A fundamental transformation was the economy's growing adoption of cash crops instead of just growing rice and grain. Vegetable and meat production increased to the point that Chinese agricultural production was adding the equivalent of California's vegetable industry every two years. Growth in the sector slowed after 1984, with agriculture falling from 40% of GDP to 16%; however, increases in agricultural productivity allowed workers to be released for work in industry and services, while simultaneously increasing agricultural production. Trade in agriculture was also liberalized and China became an exporter of food, a great contrast to its previous famines and shortages.

=== Housing ===
Housing was the first social policy-related sector to be marketized. The government began this process by selling private housing, encouraging subsidized ownership, and then addressed rent reform. Initial policies of selling private housing and subsidized ownership were not successful (there was a lack of public interest for purchasing private housing; employers were unhappy with the high subsidies required of them). Rent reform was more effective, ultimately combining cash subsidies or vouchers (which gradually decreased over time) with permitting rent to be raised.

In an effort to ease the transition to a marketized housing sector, various local governments implemented the New Policies for Newly Built Homes. These policies required all newly-built homes to be sold on the market (as opposed to being purchased by employers) and precluded new school or university graduates from obtaining public housing, while older employees were able to continue with public housing. These policies thus sought to focus on those who could afford paying higher rents and had not yet taken publicly provided housing as a given.

=== Industry ===
In the pre-reform period, industry was largely stagnant and the socialist system presented few incentives for improvements in quality and productivity. With the introduction of the dual-price system and greater autonomy for enterprise managers, productivity increased greatly in the early 1980s. Foreign enterprises and newly formed Township and Village Enterprises, owned by local government and often de facto private firms, competed successfully with state-owned enterprises. By the 1990s, large-scale privatizations reduced the market share of both the Township and Village Enterprises and state-owned enterprises and increased the private sector's market share. The state sector's share of industrial output dropped from 81% in 1980 to 15% in 2005. Foreign capital controls much of Chinese industry and plays an important role.

From virtually an industrial backwater in 1978, China is now the world's biggest producer of concrete, steel, ships and textiles, and has the world's largest automobile market. Chinese steel output quadrupled between 1980 and 2000, and from 2000 to 2006 rose from 128.5 million tons to 418.8 million tons, one-third of global production. Labor productivity at some Chinese steel firms exceeds Western productivity. From 1975 to 1992, China's automobile production rose from 139,800 to 1.1 million, rising to 9.35 million in 2008. Light industries such as textiles saw an even greater increase, due to reduced government interference. Chinese textile exports increased from 4.6% of world exports in 1980 to 24.1% in 2005. Textile output increased 18-fold over the same period.

This increase in production is largely the result of the removal of barriers to entry and increased competition; the number of industrial firms rose from 377,300 in 1980 to nearly 8 million in 1990 and 1996; the 2004 economic census, which excluded enterprises with annual sales below RMB 5 million, counted 1.33 million manufacturing firms, with Jiangsu and Zhejiang reporting more firms than the nationwide total for 1980. Compared to other East Asian industrial growth spurts, China's industrial performance exceeded Japan's but remained behind South Korea and Taiwan's economies.

=== Trade and foreign investment ===
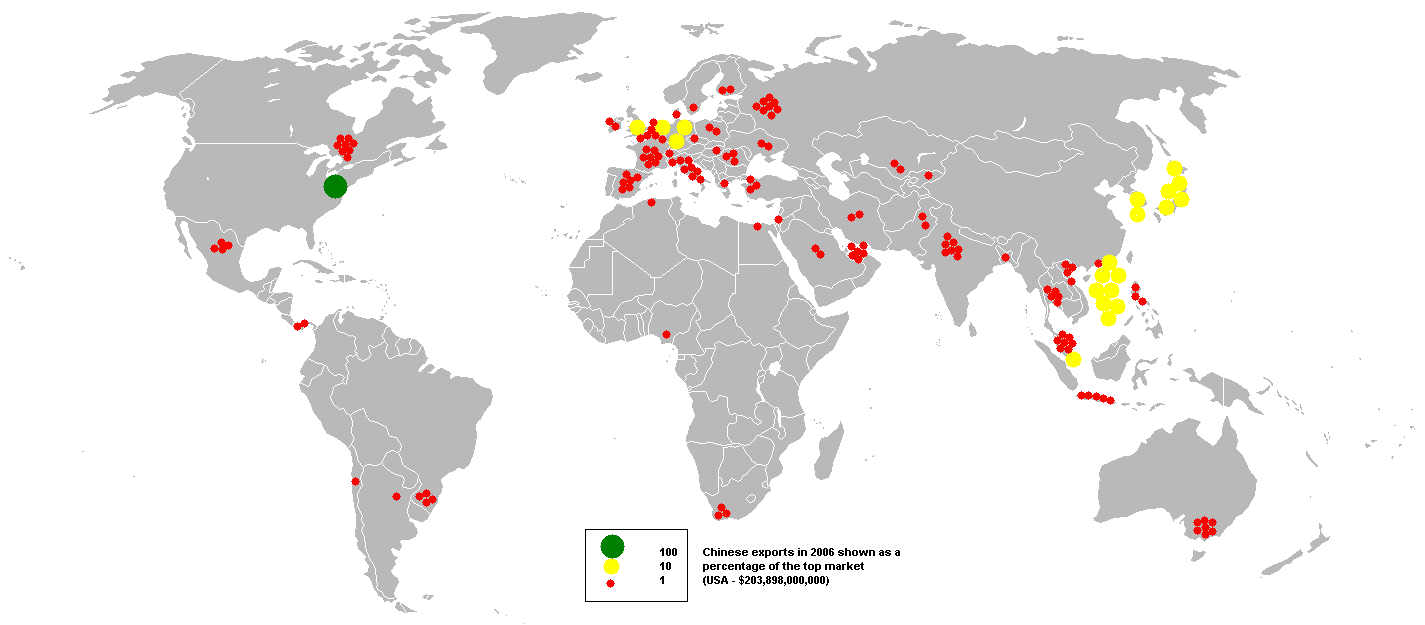
Global distribution of Chinese exports in 2006 as a percentage of the top market

Foreign investment helped to greatly increase quality, knowledge and standards, especially in heavy industry. China's experience supports the assertion that globalization greatly increases wealth for poor countries. Throughout the reform period, the government reduced tariffs and other trade barriers, with the overall tariff rate falling from 56% to 15%. By 2001, less than 40% of imports were subject to tariffs and only 9 percent of import were subject to licensing and import quotas. Even during the early reform era, protectionist policies were often circumvented by smuggling. When China joined the WTO, it agreed to considerably harsher conditions than other developing countries. Trade has increased from under 10% of GDP to 64% of GDP over the same period. China is considered the most open large country; by 2005, China's average statutory tariff on industrial products was 8.9%. The average was 30.9% for Argentina, 27.0% for Brazil, 32.4% for India, and 36.9% for Indonesia.

China's trade surplus is considered by some in the United States as threatening American jobs. In the 2000s, the Bush administration pursued protectionist policies such as tariffs and quotas to limit the import of Chinese goods. Some scholars argue that China's growing trade surplus is the result of industries in more developed Asian countries moving to China, and not a new phenomenon. China's trade policy, which allows producers to avoid paying the Value Added Tax (VAT) for exports and undervaluation of the currency since 2002, has resulted in an overdeveloped export sector and distortion of the economy overall, a result that could hamper future growth.

Foreign investment was also liberalized upon Deng's ascension. Special Economic Zones (SEZs) were created in the early 1980s to attract foreign capital by exempting them from taxes and regulations. This experiment was successful and SEZs were expanded to cover the whole Chinese coast. Although FDI fell briefly after the 1989 student protests, it increased again to 160 billion by 2004.

=== Services ===
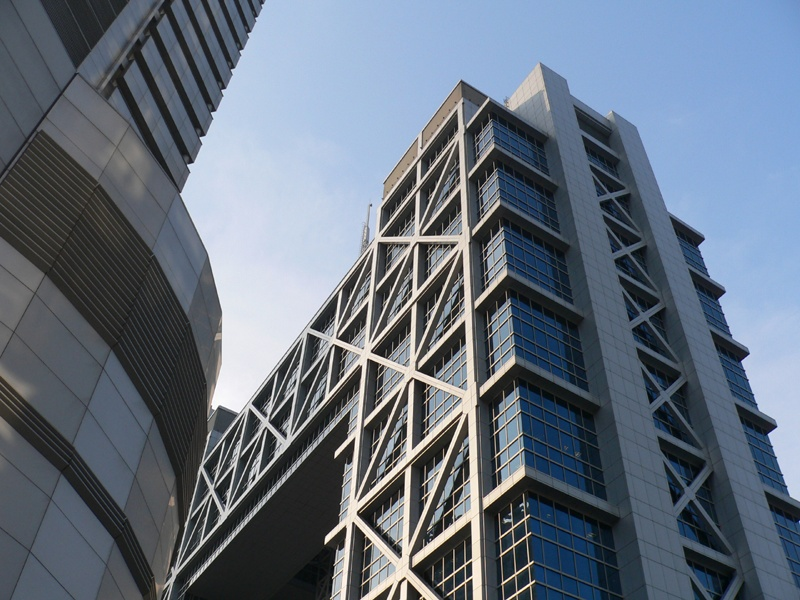
Shanghai Stock Exchange

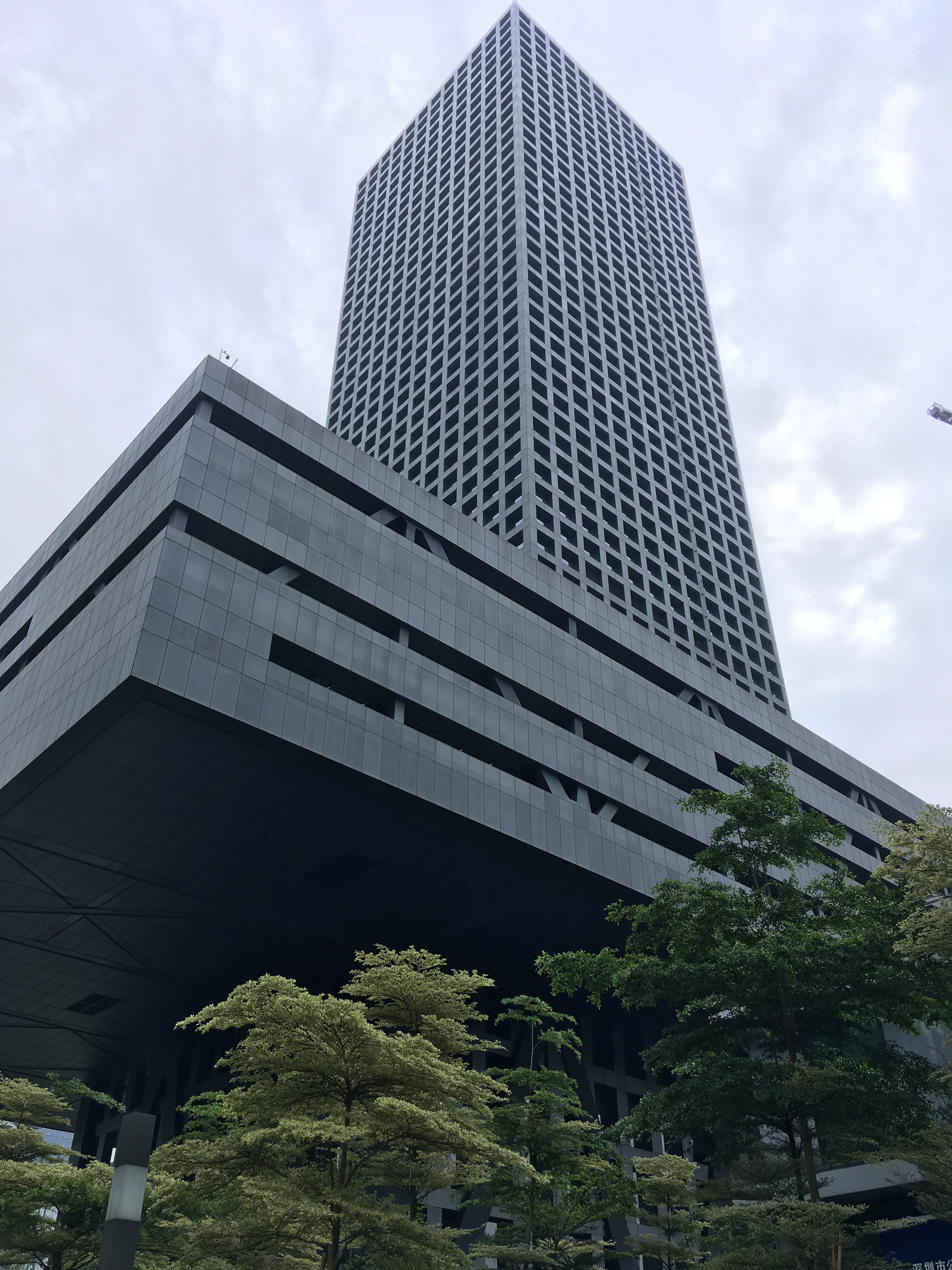
Shenzhen Stock Exchange

In the 1990s, the financial sector was liberalized. After China joined the World Trade Organization (WTO), the service sector was considerably liberalized and foreign investment was allowed; restrictions on retail, wholesale and distribution ended. Banking, financial services, insurance and telecommunications were also opened up to foreign investment.

China's banking sector is dominated by four large state-owned banks, which are largely inefficient and monopolistic. China's largest bank, ICBC, is the largest bank in the world. The financial sector is widely seen as a drag on the economy due to the inefficient state management. Non-performing loans, mostly made to local governments and unprofitable state-owned enterprises for political purposes, especially the political goal of keeping unemployment low, are a big drain on the financial system and economy, reaching over 22% of GDP by 2000, with a drop to 6.3% by 2006 due to government recapitalization of these banks. In 2006, the total amount of non-performing loans was estimated at $160 billion. Observers recommend privatization of the banking system to solve this problem, a move that was partially carried out when the four banks were floated on the stock market. China's financial markets, the Shanghai Stock Exchange and Shenzhen Stock Exchange, are relatively ineffective at raising capital, as they comprise only 11% of GDP.

Due to the weakness of the banks, firms raise most of their capital through an informal, nonstandard financial sector developed during the 1980s and 1990s, consisting largely of underground businesses and private banks. Internal finance is the most important method successful firms use to fund their activities.

By the 1980s much emphasis was placed on the role of advertising in meeting the modernization goals being promoted by Deng. Lip service was still paid to old Maoist ideals of egalitarianism, but it did not inhibit the growth of consumerism.

=== Government finances ===
In the pre-reform era, government was funded by profits from state-owned enterprises, much like the Soviet Union. As the state sector fell in importance and profitability, government revenues, especially that of the central government in Beijing, fell substantially and the government relied on a confused system of inventory taxes. Government revenues fell from 35% of GDP to 11% of GDP in the mid-1990s, excluding revenue from state-owned enterprises, with the central government's budget at just 3% of GDP. The tax system was reformed in 1994 when inventory taxes were unified into a single VAT of 17% on all manufacturing, repair, and assembly activities and an excise tax on 11 items, with the VAT becoming the main income source, accounting for half of government revenue. The 1994 reform also increased the central government's share of revenues, increasing it to 9% of GDP.

== Academic studies ==
=== Reasons for success ===
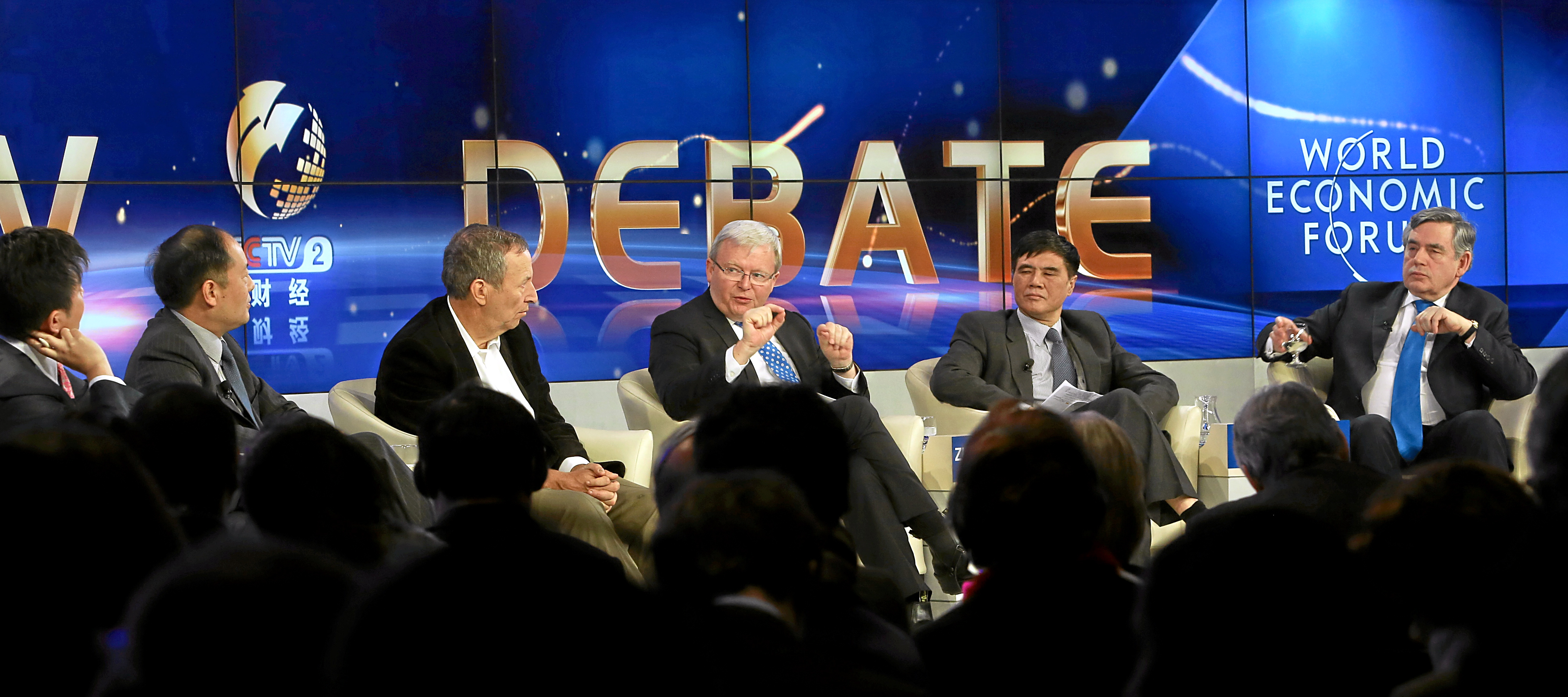
Discussion of "China's Next Global Agenda" during the World Economic Forum (2013)

Scholars have proposed a number of theories to explain China's successful transition from a planned to a socialist market economy. This occurred despite unfavorable factors such as the troublesome legacies of socialism, considerable erosion of the work ethic, decades of anti-market propaganda, and the "lost generation" whose education disintegrated amid the disruption of the Cultural Revolution.

One notable theory is that decentralization of state authority allowed local leaders to experiment with various ways to privatize the state sector and energize the economy. Although Deng was not the originator of many of the reforms, he approved them. Another theory focuses on internal incentives within the Chinese government, in which officials presiding over areas of high economic growth were more likely to be promoted. This made local and provincial governments "hungry for investment," who competed to reduce regulations and barriers to investment to boost both economic growth and their careers. Such reforms were possible because Deng cultivated pro-market followers in the government. Herman Kahn argued that Confucian ethic was playing a "similar but more spectacular role in the modernization of East Asia than the Protestant ethic played in Europe".

Taken together, Yuen Yuen Ang argues in Foreign Affairs that political reforms took place with economic reforms under Deng, except the former did not take Western forms. She writes, "To be sure, Deng's reforms emphasized brute capital accumulation rather than holistic development, which led to environmental degradation, inequality, and other social problems. Still they undoubtedly kicked China's growth machine into gear by making the bureaucracy results oriented, fiercely competitive, and responsive to business needs, qualities that are normally associated with democracies." But this only applies to the Deng era. Ang notes that since 2012, when Xi Jinping took over, the new leader has reversed Deng's political reforms and limits to power, "just as political freedoms have become imperative for continued economic growth."

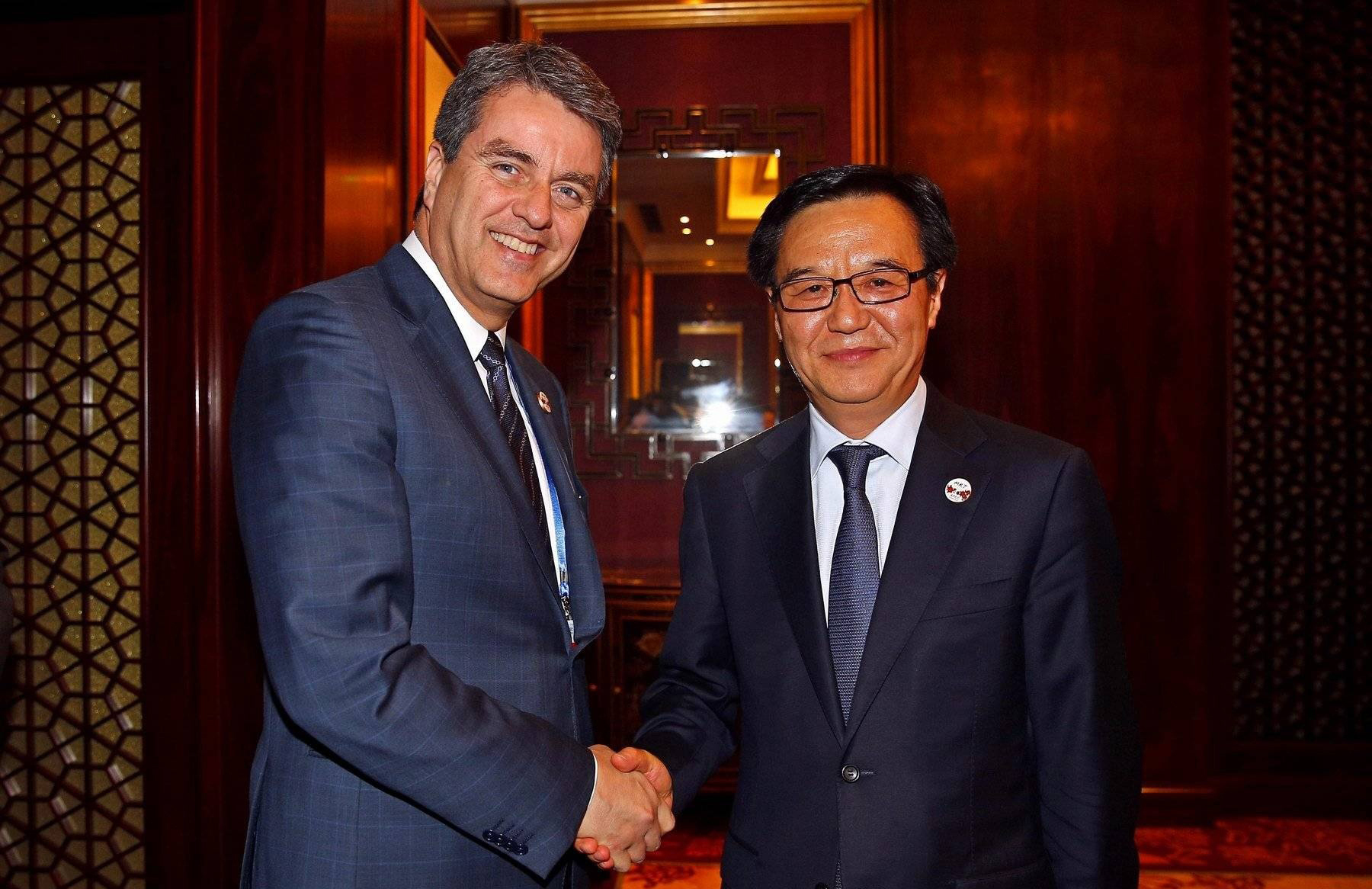
Roberto Azevêdo, Director-General of WTO, met with China's Minister of Commerce Gao Hucheng in Qingdao (2014).

China's success is also due to the export-led growth strategy used successfully by the Four Asian Tigers beginning with Japan in the 1960s–1970s and other newly industrialized countries. In 2001, China joined the World Trade Organization (WTO). As of 2006, over 400 of the Fortune 500 companies had entered the Chinese market, while at the same time a considerable number of Chinese companies had opened their markets outside of China. Foreign aids to China, including those from Hong Kong, Macau and Taiwan, also played an important role. Since the beginning of opening, China has received a significant amount of aid from major developed countries such as the United States, Japan, Germany, France and the United Kingdom. For instance, through its Official Development Assistance (ODA), Japan had offered China various forms of assistance worth 3.65 trillion Yen as of 2018. On the other hand, the assistance from the U.S. reached a total of US$556 million as of 2012, and has "helped Tibetan communities improve livelihoods, promote sustainable development and environmental conservation, and preserve cultural traditions...also supports targeted programs that strengthen cooperation on combatting the spread of HIV/AIDS and other pandemic and emerging diseases as well as rule of law programs."

In contrast to the neoliberal view which emphasizes benefits from decentralization, increased privatization, and globalization, Professor Lin Chun concludes that studies have demonstrated pre-reform period factors that are at least as compelling factors in China's success. Those factors include strong "human capital" accumulated through decades of state investments in basic needs including health care and public education, state and rural collective ownership of land, the public sector's retaining of strategic industries, government sponsorship of trade and technology transfers, and public spending.

The collapse of the Soviet Bloc and centrally planned economies in 1989 provided renewed impetus for China to further reform its economy through different policies to avoid a similar fate. China also wanted to avoid the Russian ad-hoc experiments with market capitalism under Boris Yeltsin resulting in the rise of powerful oligarchs, corruption, and the loss of state revenue which exacerbated economic disparity.

The Cultural Revolution contributed to China's economic growth in long run. According to Mancur Olson, the Cultural Revolution attacked the very administrators and managers on which Chinese economy depended, and the immediate result was instability and administrative chaos in short run. A longer-run result was that there were not nearly as many well-entrenched interest groups as in the Soviet Union and the Eastern Bloc, so when Deng Xiaoping and the other pragmatists took power, few interest groups remained whose lobbying could undermine Deng's market-oriented reforms, because the Cultural Revolution had destroyed the narrowly entrenched interests with a stake in the status quo.

=== Comparison to other developing economies ===
Development trends of Chinese and Indian GDP (1950–2010)

China's transition from a planned economy to a socialist market economy has often been compared with economies in Eastern Europe that are undergoing a similar transition. China's performance has been praised for avoiding the major shocks and inflation that plagued the Eastern Bloc. The Eastern bloc economies saw declines varying from 13% to 65% in GDP at the beginning of reforms, while Chinese growth has been very strong since the beginning of reform. China also managed to avoid the hyperinflation of 200 to 1,000% that Eastern Europe experienced. This success is attributed to the gradualist and decentralized approach of the Chinese government, which allowed market institutions to develop to the point where they could replace state planning. This contrasts with the "big bang" approach of Eastern Europe, where the state-owned sector was rapidly privatized with employee buyouts, but retained much of the earlier, inefficient management. Other factors thought to account for the differences are the greater urbanization of the CIS economies and differences in social welfare and other institutions. Another argument is that, in the Eastern European economies, political change is sometimes seen to have made gradualist reforms impossible, so the shocks and inflation were unavoidable.

China's economic growth has been compared with other developing countries, such as Brazil, Mexico, and India. GDP growth in China outstrips all other developing countries, with only India after 1990 coming close to China's experience. Scholars believe that high rates of investments, especially increases in capital invested per worker, have contributed to China's superior economic performance. China's relatively free economy, with less government intervention and regulation, is cited by scholars as an important factor in China's superior performance compared to other developing countries.

=== Criticism and development issues ===
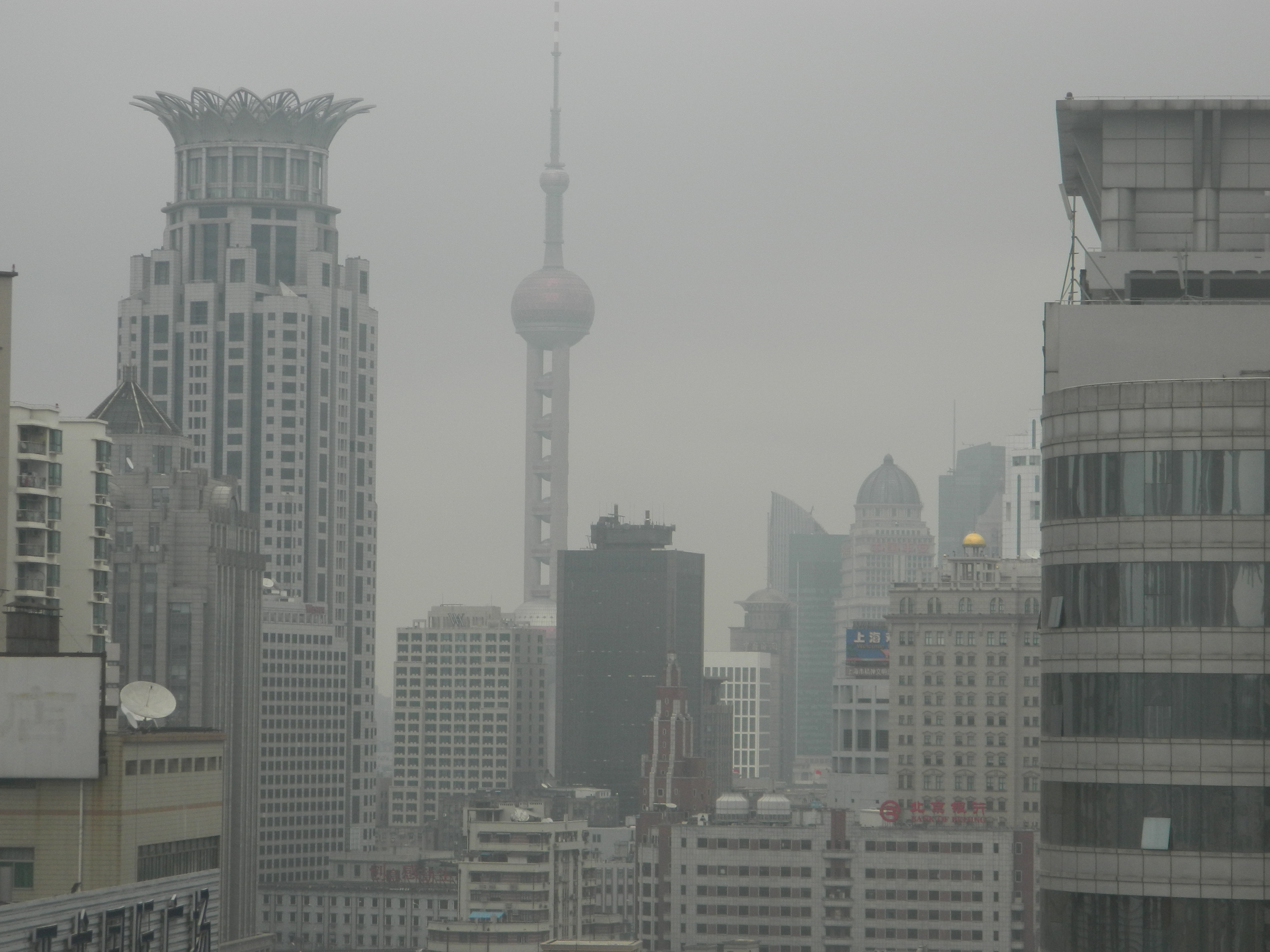
Air pollution has become a major environmental issue in China resulting from the economic development. (The picture shows thick haze in Lujiazui of Shanghai in 2011.)

Greenhouse gas emissions per person in the highest-emitting countries. Though China has the greatest total annual carbon dioxide emissions, the U.S. and a few other high-emitting countries exceed China in per capita emissions.

Share of global carbon dioxide emissions, total for each country without regard to population size

The government retains monopolies in several sectors, such as petroleum and banking. The recent reversal of some reforms have left some observers dubbing 2008 the "third anniversary of the end of reforms". Nevertheless, observers believe that China's economy can continue growing at rates of 6–8 percent until 2025, though a reduction in state intervention is considered by some to be necessary for sustained growth.

It has been reported, including by the National Bureau of Statistics, that over the years that the GDP figures and other economic data from local Chinese governments may be inflated or manipulated otherwise. Officials from central government have said that local government officials sometimes falsify economic data to meet the economic growth targets or for personal promotions.

Despite reducing poverty and increasing China's wealth, Deng's reforms have been criticized by the Chinese New Left for increasing inequality and allowing private entrepreneurs to purchase state assets at reduced prices. These accusations were especially intense during the Lang–Gu dispute, in which New Left academic Larry Hsien Ping Lang accused entrepreneur Gu Sujung of usurping state assets, after which Gu was imprisoned. The Hu–Wen Administration adopted some New Left policies, such as halting privatizations and increasing the state sector's importance in the economy, and Keynesian policies that have been criticized by some Chinese economists such as Zhang Weiying, who advocate a policy of deregulation, tax cuts and privatization.

Other criticisms focus on the effects of rapid industrialization on public health and the environment. For instance, China is the largest CO_{2} emitter in the world. However, scholars believe that public health issues are unlikely to become major obstacles to the growth of China's economy during the coming decades, and studies have shown that air quality and other environmental measures in China are better than those in developed countries, such as the United States and Japan, at the same level of development. Air pollution reached its peak in the early 2010s, and has declined significantly since then.

Some scholars have also contested the claims that the reform has led to as dramatic reduction in poverty as reported. The dramatic reduction reported relies on the use of the World Bank poverty line of $1.90 per day, which some have argued is an inaccurate means of measuring poverty in pre-reform China, as during the Mao era and the decade after its end, an effective and far-reaching system of public provision existed in China which kept prices low, and a food rationing system which (except during the Great Chinese Famine years) effectively guaranteed the vast majority of China's population with access to food. Using China's "Basic Needs Poverty Line", calculated based on OECD datasets, the proportion of Chinese people unable to afford a "subsistence basket" (basic needs) has increased since the increasing pace of reforms in the late 1980s and 1990s.

The economic reforms were initially accompanied with a series of political reforms in the 1980s, supported by Deng Xiaoping. However, many of the planned political reforms ended after the 1989 Tiananmen Square protests and massacre. Lack of political reform contributed to the serious corruption issue in China. Additionally, China's economic growth has led to the rise of a real estate bubble from 2005 to 2011 and a property sector crisis since 2020.

Since the late 1970s, Deng and other senior leaders including Chen Yun and Li Xiannian supported the "one-child policy" to cope with the overpopulation crisis. However, the 2010 census data showed that the population growth rate dropped to low levels. Due to the financial pressure and other factors, many young couples increasingly choose to delay or even abandon the plan of raising a second child even after the Chinese government largely relaxed the one-child policy in late 2015. This has led to the aging of the Chinese population, which economists have said could potentially harm the economy in the future.

== See also ==
- Go Out policy
- China's political reforms in 1980s
- Japanese economic miracle
- Khrushchev Thaw
- Reformists (Chinese Communist Party)
- Seek truth from facts
- Xiagang
- Tiger economy
- Infitah
- Infiraj
