= Time is Money, Efficiency is Life =

Well-known slogan of Chinese economic reform

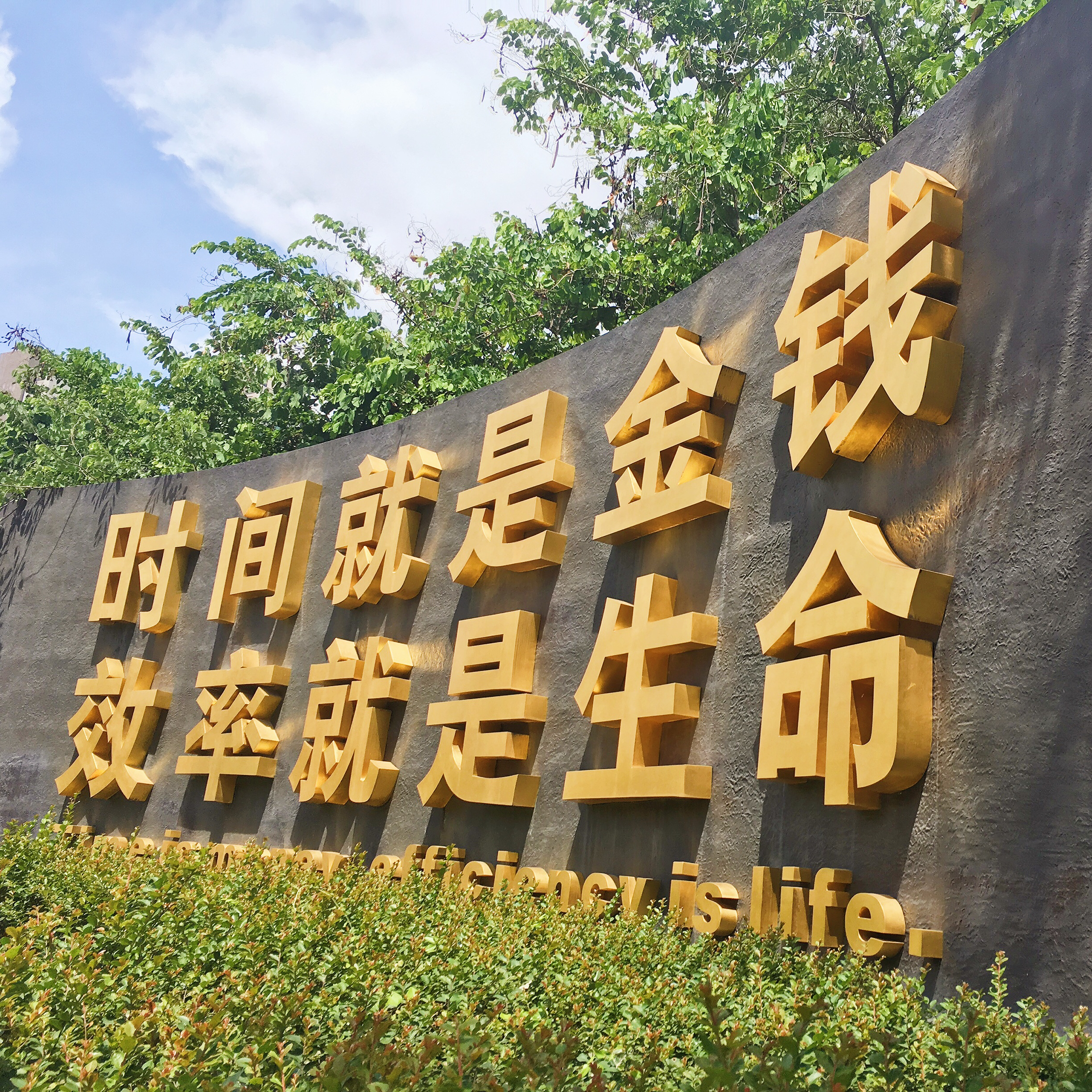
The slogan was made a large sign in Shekou, Shenzhen (at the junction of Nanhai Boulevard, Taizi Road and Gongye 1st Road).

"Time is Money, Efficiency is Life" (Chinese: 时间就是金钱，效率就是生命; pinyin: Shíjiān jiùshì jīnqián, xiàolǜ jiùshì shēngmìng) is a well-known slogan of reform and opening up. It was initially a quote from Yuan Geng who made it public in 1981 as the director of Shekou, Shenzhen. The slogan is often associated with the "Shenzhen speed". After Deng Xiaoping made an inspection tour to Shenzhen in 1984, the slogan became widely known in China.

Billboard in a residential neighborhood in Shekou (2011)

== See also ==
- Time is money (aphorism)
- Shenzhen speed
- Shekou
