= Keyuan station (Shenzhen Metro) =

Metro station in Shenzhen, China

Keyuan 科苑
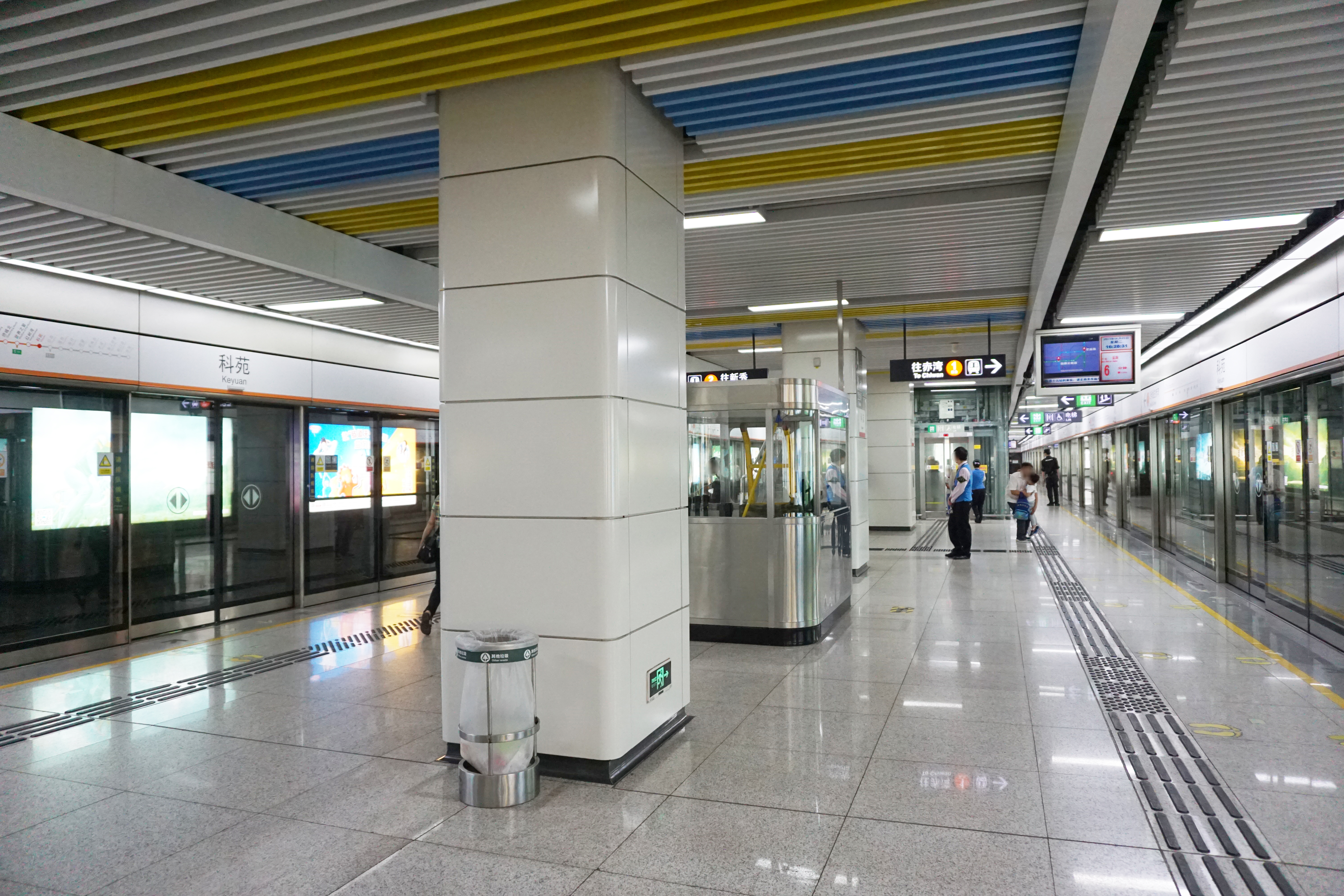
- Line 2 platform

Chinese name
- Chinese: 科苑
Transcriptions
Standard Mandarin
- Hanyu Pinyin: Kē Yuàn
Yue: Cantonese
- Jyutping: Fo1 Jyun2

General information
- Location: Nanshan District, Shenzhen, Guangdong; China
- Coordinates: 22°31′37″N 113°56′48″E
- Operated by: SZMC (Shenzhen Metro Group); MTR China Railway Electrification Rail Transit (Shenzhen) Co., Ltd (MTR Rail Transit (Shenzhen) Co., Ltd. and China Railway Electrification Bureau Group Co., Ltd.)
- Lines: Line 2 Line 13
- Platforms: 4 (2 island platforms)
- Tracks: 2

Construction
- Structure type: Underground
- Accessible: Yes

Other information
- Station code: 210

History
- Opened: Line 2: 28 December 2010 (15 years ago); Line 13: 28 December 2024 (16 months ago)

Services
Preceding station	Shenzhen Metro	Following station
Houhai towards Chiwan	Line 2	Hongshuwan towards Liantang (Line 8: Xichong)
Houhai towards Shenzhen Bay Checkpoint	Line 13	Yuehaimen towards Shangwu
Route map
Location

Keyuan station (Chinese: 科苑站; pinyin: Kēyuàn Zhàn; Jyutping: Fo1 Jyun2 Zaam6) is an interchange station between Line 2 and Line 13 of the Shenzhen Metro. The Line 2 station opened on 28 December 2010. The Line 13 station opened on 28 December 2024.
