= Zhongzhou Holdings Financial Center =

Supertall skyscraper in Shenzhen, Guangdong, China

- 中洲控股中心
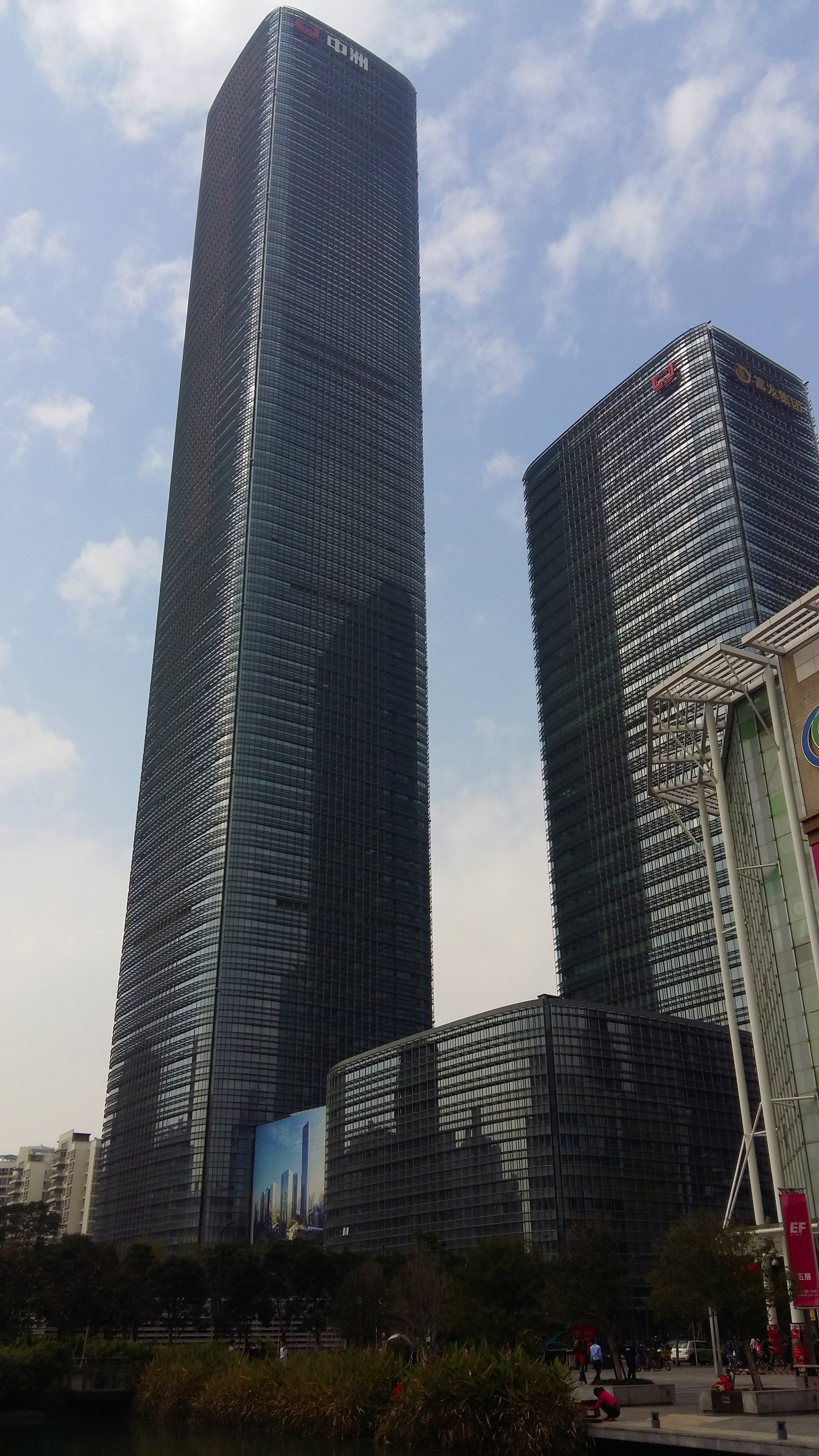
- The tower in 2016
- Interactive map of the Zhongzhou Holdings Financial Center area
- Former names: SCC Centre
- Alternative names: Centralcon Centre, Heung Kong Tower

General information
- Status: Completed
- Type: Hotel / Office
- Location: 88 First Haide Road, Nanshan District, Shenzhen, Guangdong, China
- Coordinates: 22°31′14″N 113°55′43″E
- Groundbreaking: December 6, 2007
- Construction started: October 3, 2008
- Completed: March 9, 2015
- Owner: Shenzhen Zhongzhou Investment Holdings Ltd.

Height
- Architectural: 300.8 m (987 ft)
- Tip: 300.8 m (987 ft)
- Top floor: 260.7 m (855 ft)

Technical details
- Floor count: 61
- Floor area: 233,902 m^{2} (2,517,700 sq ft)
- Lifts/elevators: 45

Design and construction
- Architect: Adrian Smith
- Structural engineer: Beijing Institute of Architectural Design
- Main contractor: China Construction Third Building Group

Other information
- Number of rooms: 388
- Parking: 1,221

Zhongzhou Holdings Financial Center
- Chinese: 中洲控股中心
Transcriptions
Standard Mandarin
- Hanyu Pinyin: Zhōngzhōu Kònggǔ Zhōngxīn
Yue: Cantonese
- Jyutping: zung1 zau1 hung3 gu2 zung1 sam1

Zhongzhou Holdings Financial Center (Chinese: 中洲控股中心) is a 300.8-metre (987-foot) supertall skyscraper in Nanshan district, Shenzhen, Guangdong, China. Construction started in 2009 and was completed in 2014. The building is mixed-use and contains a 340-room Marriott hotel with a large atrium in the upper floors. The atrium is clearly visible from the outside.

== Location ==
It is situated within the Nanshan CBD development within walking distance from Houhai Station of Shenzhen Metro. Neighbouring buildings include the Tencent Binhai Mansion, Shenzhen Bay Sports Center, One Shenzhen Bay, China Resources Headquarters and Coastal City.

== See also ==
- List of tallest buildings in Shenzhen
- List of tallest buildings in China
