= The Castings =

Residential building in Manchester, England

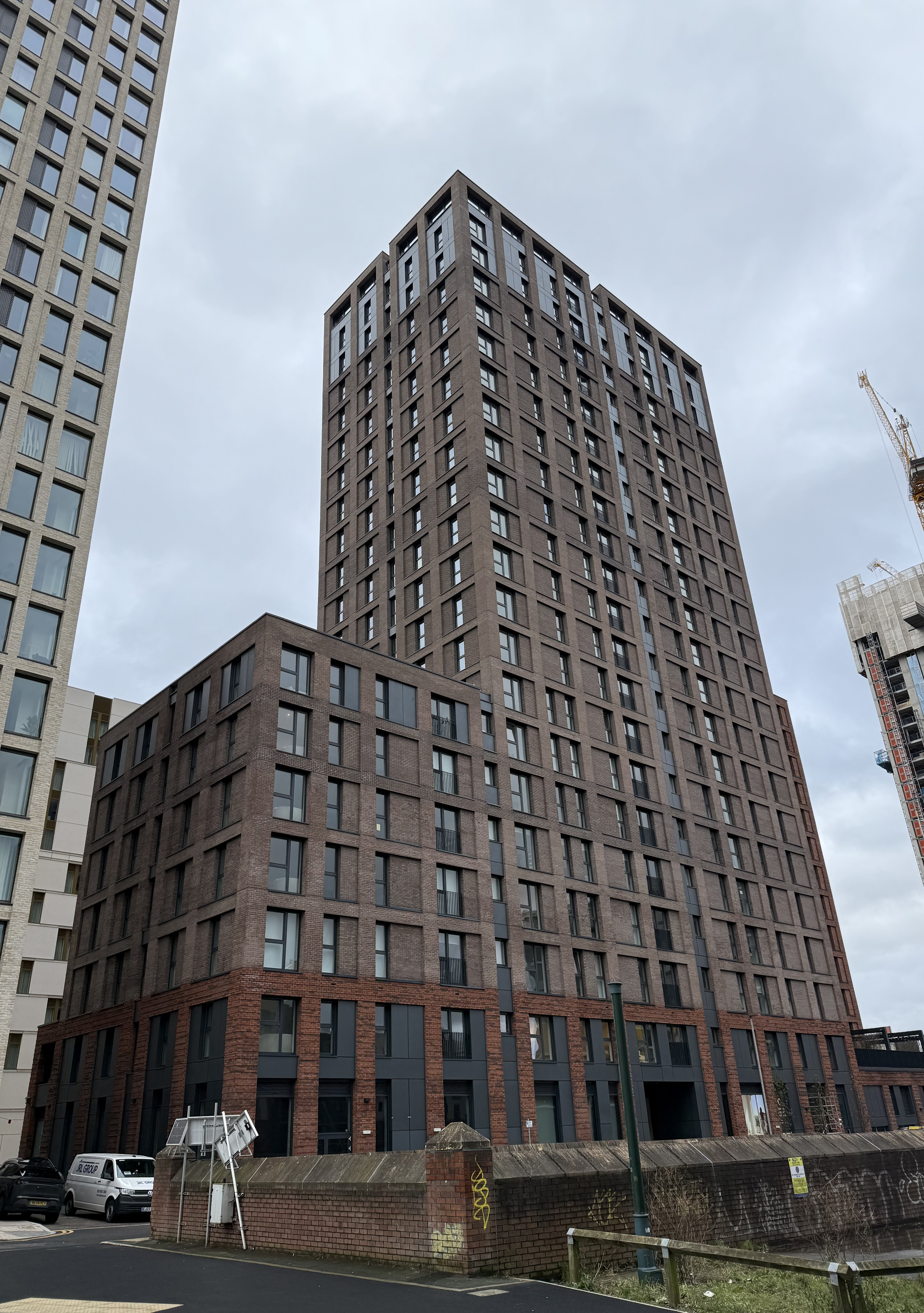
- The Castings building on Heyrod Street in Manchester, January 2025

General information
- Status: Completed
- Type: Residential
- Location: New Islington, Manchester, Greater Manchester, England, United Kingdom, The Castings, 9 Heyrod Street, Manchester, M1 2DY
- Completed: June 2024
- Owner: CDL Hospitality Trusts

Height
- Height: 78 m (256 ft)

Technical details
- Floor count: 25

Design and construction
- Architects: CallisonRTKL; Sheppard Robson
- Developer: Packaged Living
- Main contractor: Midgard

Other information
- Number of units: 352

Website
- thecastingsmcr.co.uk

The Castings is a 78 m (256 ft) tall, 25-storey residential tower containing 352 apartments in Manchester, England. It is located in Piccadilly as part of the Portugal Street East regeneration area. The building was designed by CallisonRTKL. As of March 2025, it is the joint 48th-tallest building in Greater Manchester with Victoria House on Great Ancoats Street nearby.

== History ==
=== Planning ===
The planning phase of The Castings began with the acquisition of a one-acre plot on Heyrod Street in January 2020 by Packaged Living and Fiera Real Estate. A planning application was approved by Manchester City Council in February 2020 which proposed a 352-unit build-to-rent residential development, along with a new public square.

=== Construction ===
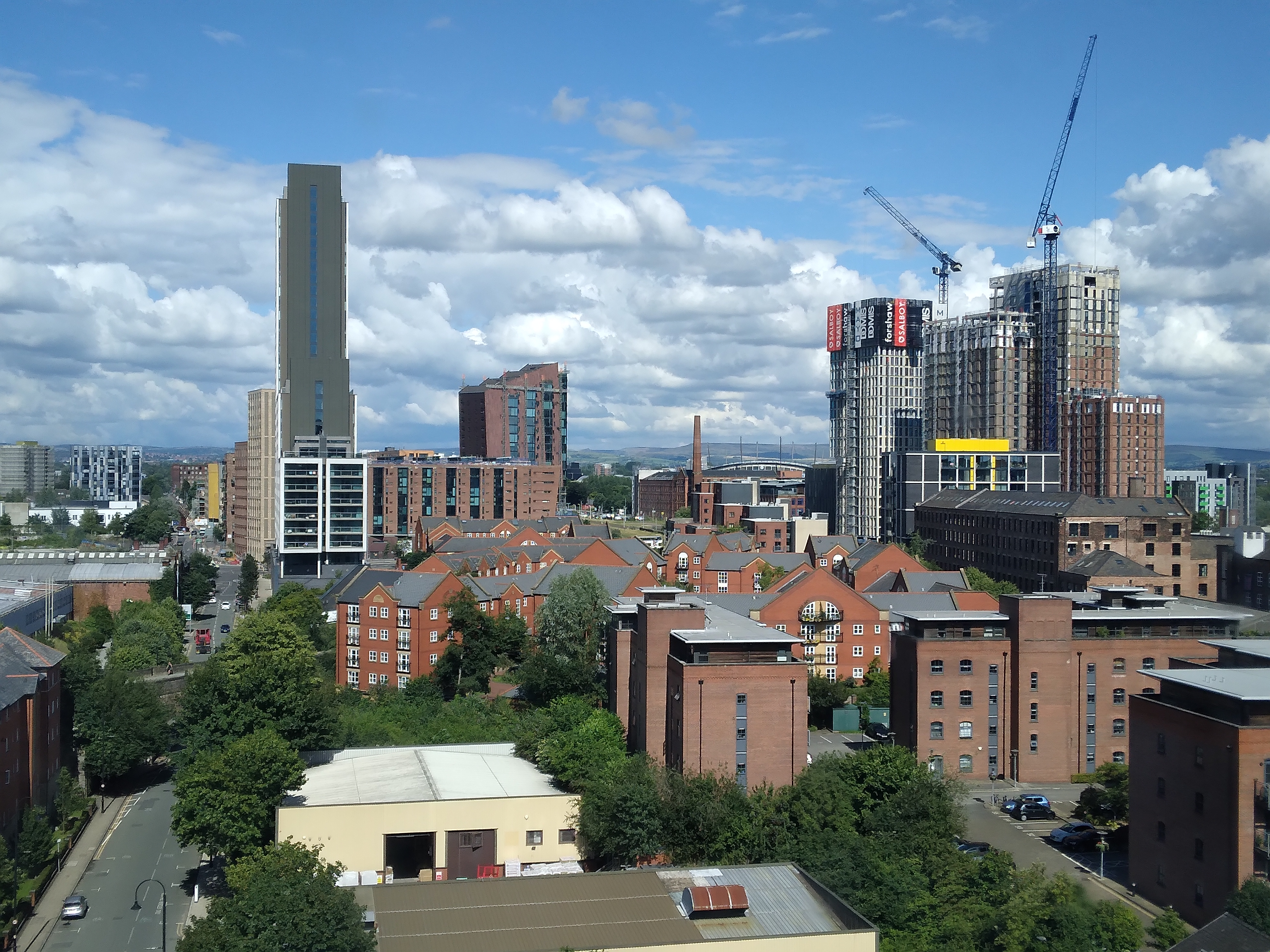
Victoria House and The Castings under construction (to right of image) in July 2023, as seen from Piccadilly Gate. Tall building on left is Oxygen Towers

Demolition of the two brick warehouses on the site by the lead contractor Midgard started in August 2021. Construction of the building was completed in June 2024.

== See also ==
- List of tallest buildings in the United Kingdom
- List of tallest buildings and structures in Greater Manchester
