= Grand Gateway Shanghai =

- 港汇广场
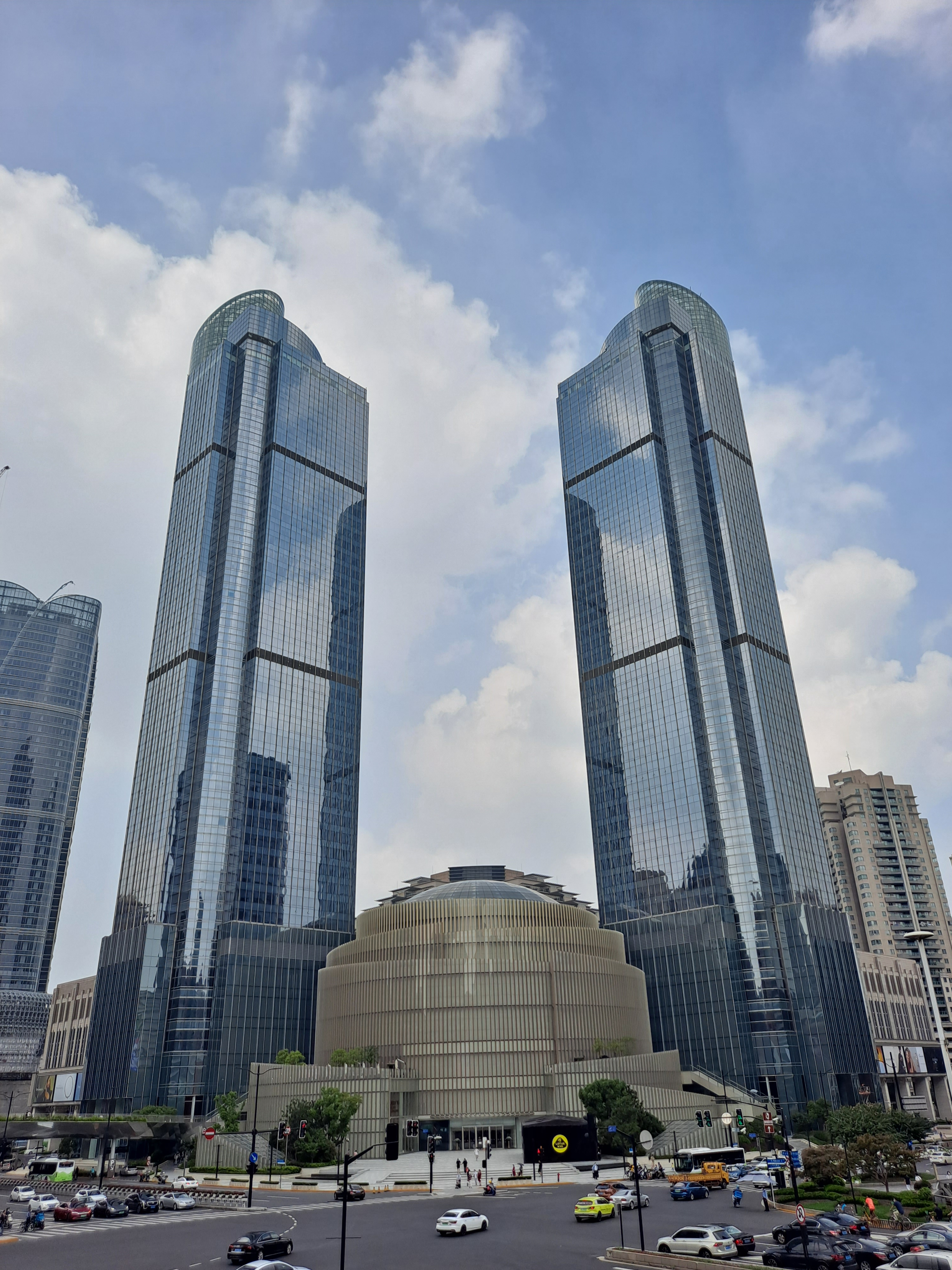
- Interactive map of the Grand Gateway Shanghai area

General information
- Type: Office, retail
- Location: Xuhui District, Shanghai, China
- Coordinates: 31.1965°N 121.4325°E
- Construction started: 1994
- Completed: 2005

Height
- Roof: 262 m (860 ft)

Technical details
- Floor count: 52

Design and construction
- Architect: Callison

Grand Gateway Shanghai (Chinese: 港汇广场; pinyin: Gǎnghuì Guǎngchǎng) is an office complex consisting of two identical skyscrapers in the Xujiahui area of Shanghai, China. It was completed in 2005.

== Design and construction ==
Grand Gateway was designed by Callison Architecture.

Construction of the towers was halted in 1997 due to the Asian financial crisis. In 2002, construction resumed. The buildings were completed in 2005 and are currently the 4th tallest twin towers in the world. Each tower is 262 m high and has 52 stories.

The towers are the 71st tallest existing buildings in the world when measured up to the highest architectural point which is the top of the domes, and the 9th tallest in Shanghai, making them a landmark in the area. The height of the roof is 224.9 metres.

The Grand Gateway 66 shopping mall is located at the base of the towers. The podium contains 1.1 million square feet of retail and entertainment space.

There is also a residential development, called Grand Gateway Garden, consisting of two towers, each 100 m high.

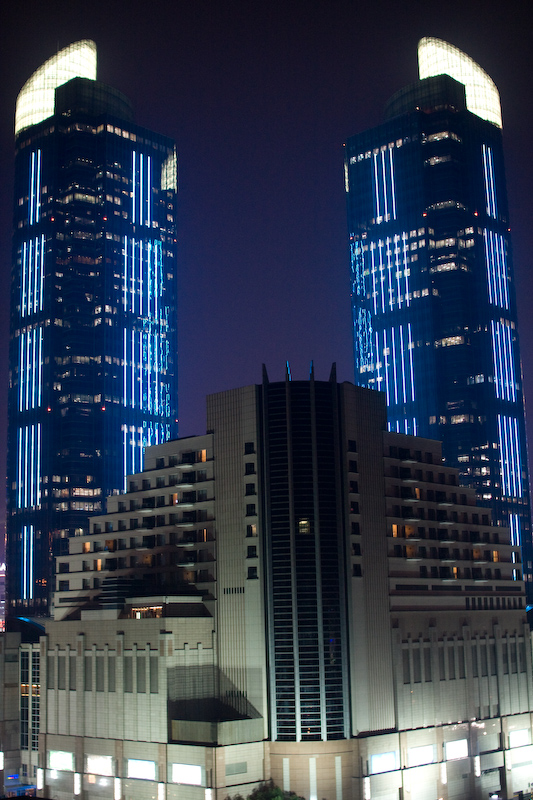
The Grand Gateway towers are a grand local landmark, especially in the evenings when the tops are lit

== See also ==
- List of tallest buildings in Shanghai
