= Houhai station =

Metro station in Shenzhen, Guangdong, China

Houhai 后海
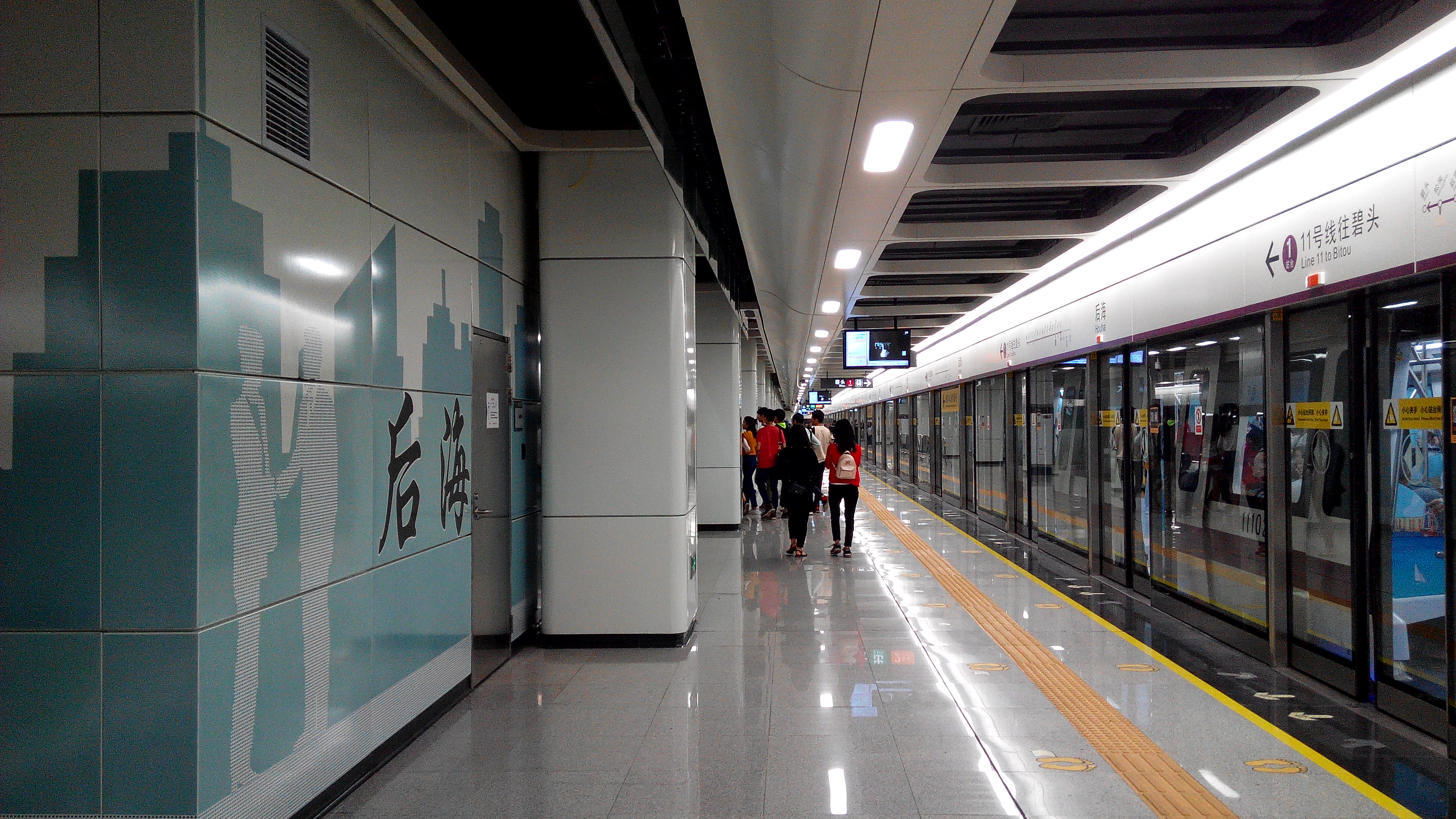
- Line 11 platform

Chinese name
- Chinese: 后海
- Literal meaning: Deep Bay
Transcriptions
Standard Mandarin
- Hanyu Pinyin: Hòuhǎi
Yue: Cantonese
- Jyutping: Hau6 Hoi2

General information
- Location: Nanshan District, Shenzhen, Guangdong; China
- Coordinates: 22°31′27.03″N 113°56′50.6″E
- Operated by: SZMC (Shenzhen Metro Group); MTR China Railway Electrification Rail Transit (Shenzhen) Co., Ltd (MTR Rail Transit (Shenzhen) Co., Ltd. and China Railway Electrification Bureau Group Co., Ltd.)
- Lines: Line 2; Line 11; Line 13
- Platforms: 6 (3 island platforms)
- Tracks: 6

Construction
- Structure type: Underground
- Accessible: Yes

Other information
- Station code: 209

History
- Opened: Line 2: 28 December 2010 (15 years ago); Line 11: 28 June 2016 (10 years ago); Line 13: 28 December 2024 (18 months ago)
- Previous names: Nanshan Shopping Center Station

Services
Preceding station	Shenzhen Metro	Following station
Dengliang towards Chiwan	Line 2	Keyuan towards Liantang (Line 8: Xichong)
Nanshan towards Bitou	Line 11	Hongshuwan South towards Hongling South
Talent Park towards Shenzhen Bay Checkpoint	Line 13	Keyuan towards Lisonglang
Route map
B2F
B3F
Location

Houhai station (Chinese: 后海站; pinyin: Hòuhǎi Zhàn; Jyutping: Hau6 Hoi2 Zaam6; lit. 'Deep Bay station'), formerly Nanshan Shopping Center station (Chinese: 南山商业中心站; Chinese: 南山商業中心站; pinyin: Nán Shān Shāng Yè Zhōng Xīn Zhàn; Jyutping: Naam4 Saan1 Soeng1 Jip6 Zung1 Sam1 Zaam6), is an interchange station between Shenzhen Metro Line 2, Line 11 and Line 13. Line 2 platforms opened on 28 December 2010, Line 11 platforms opened on 28 June 2016 and Line 13 platforms opened on 28 December 2024. It is located within the Nanshan District CBD development. It serves the population coming to nearby shopping centres as well as office buildings and it is busier and more heavily used than most other Line 2 stations.

== Station layout (Line 2 and Line 11) ==
G	-	Exit
B1F; Concourse	Lobby	Ticket machines, customer service, shops, vending machines, transfer passage between Lines 2 and 11
B2F; 2 8 Platforms		2 towards Chiwan (Dengliang)
B2F; 2 8 Platforms	Island platform, doors will open on the left
B2F; 2 8 Platforms		8 towards Xichong (Keyuan)
B3F; 11 Platforms		11 towards Bitou (Nanshan)
B3F; 11 Platforms	Island platform, doors will open on the left
B3F; 11 Platforms		11 towards Hongling South (Hongshuwan South)

== Station layout (Line 13) ==
G	-	Exits
B1F; Concourse	Lobby	Ticket Machines, Customer Service
B2F; Platforms	Platform 1	13 towards Shenzhen Bay Checkpoint (Talent Park)
B2F; Platforms	Island platform, doors will open on the left
B2F; Platforms	Platform 2	13 towards Lisonglang (Keyuan)

== Gallery ==
=== Platforms ===
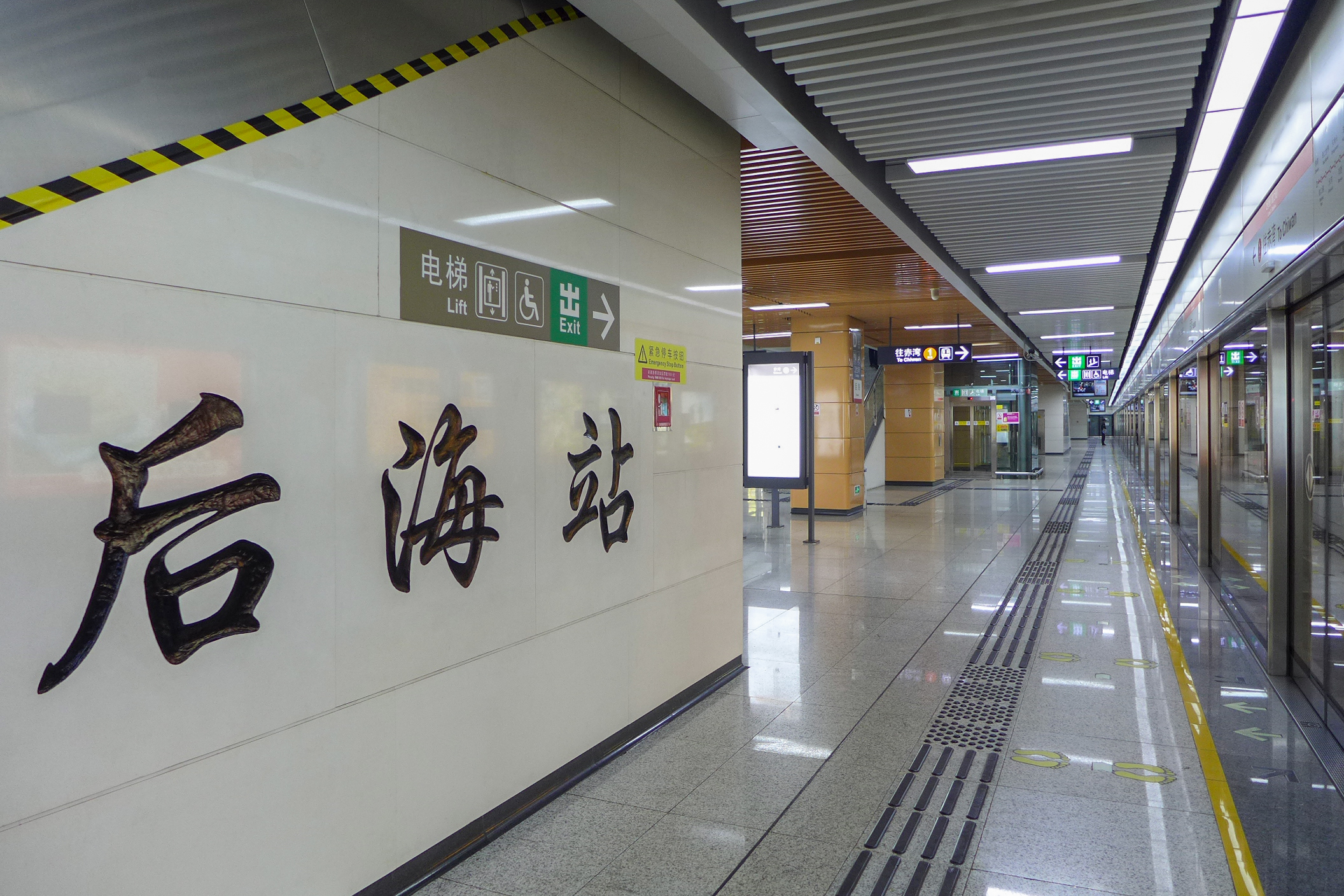
Line 2 Platforms

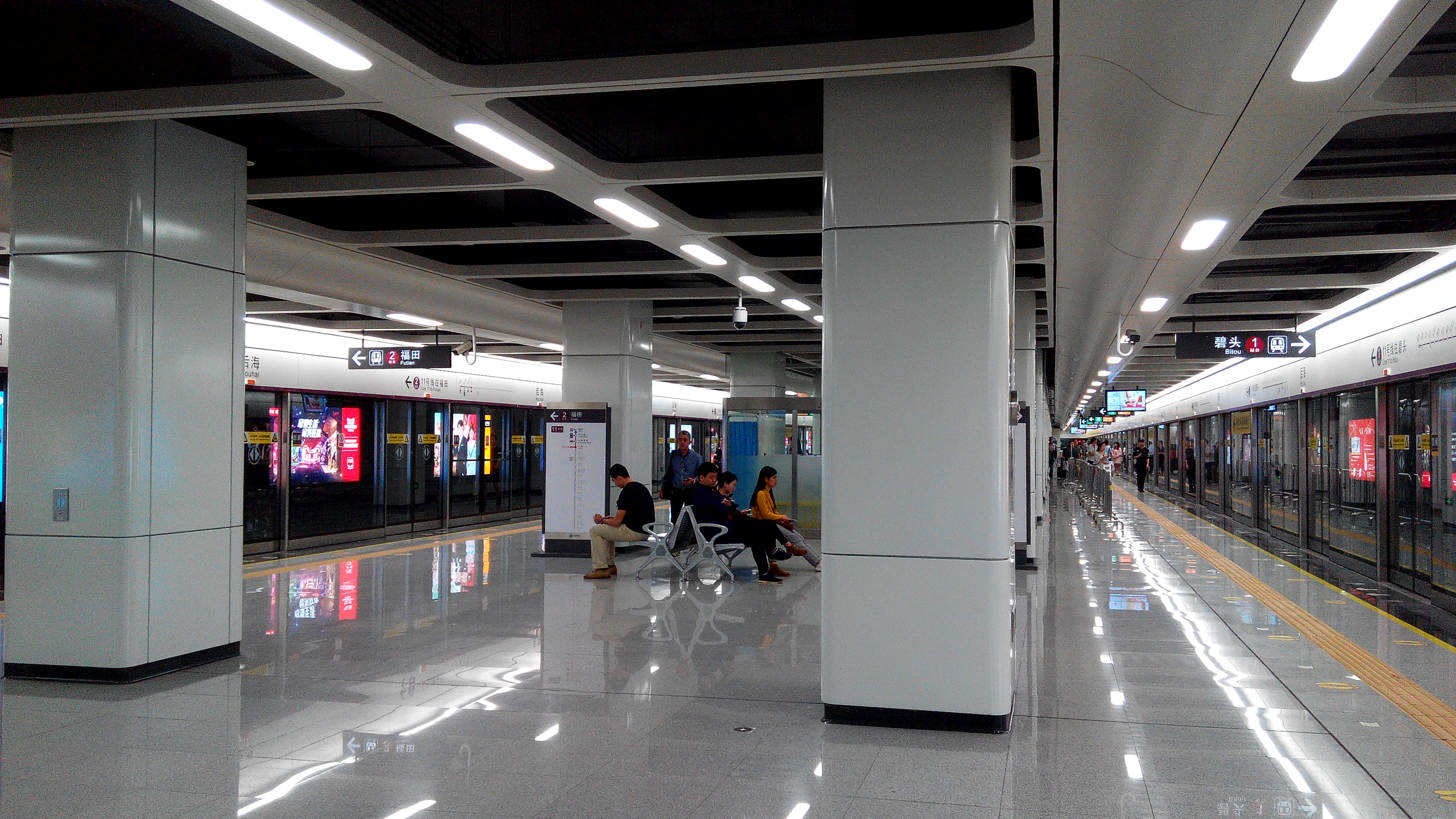
Line 11 Platforms

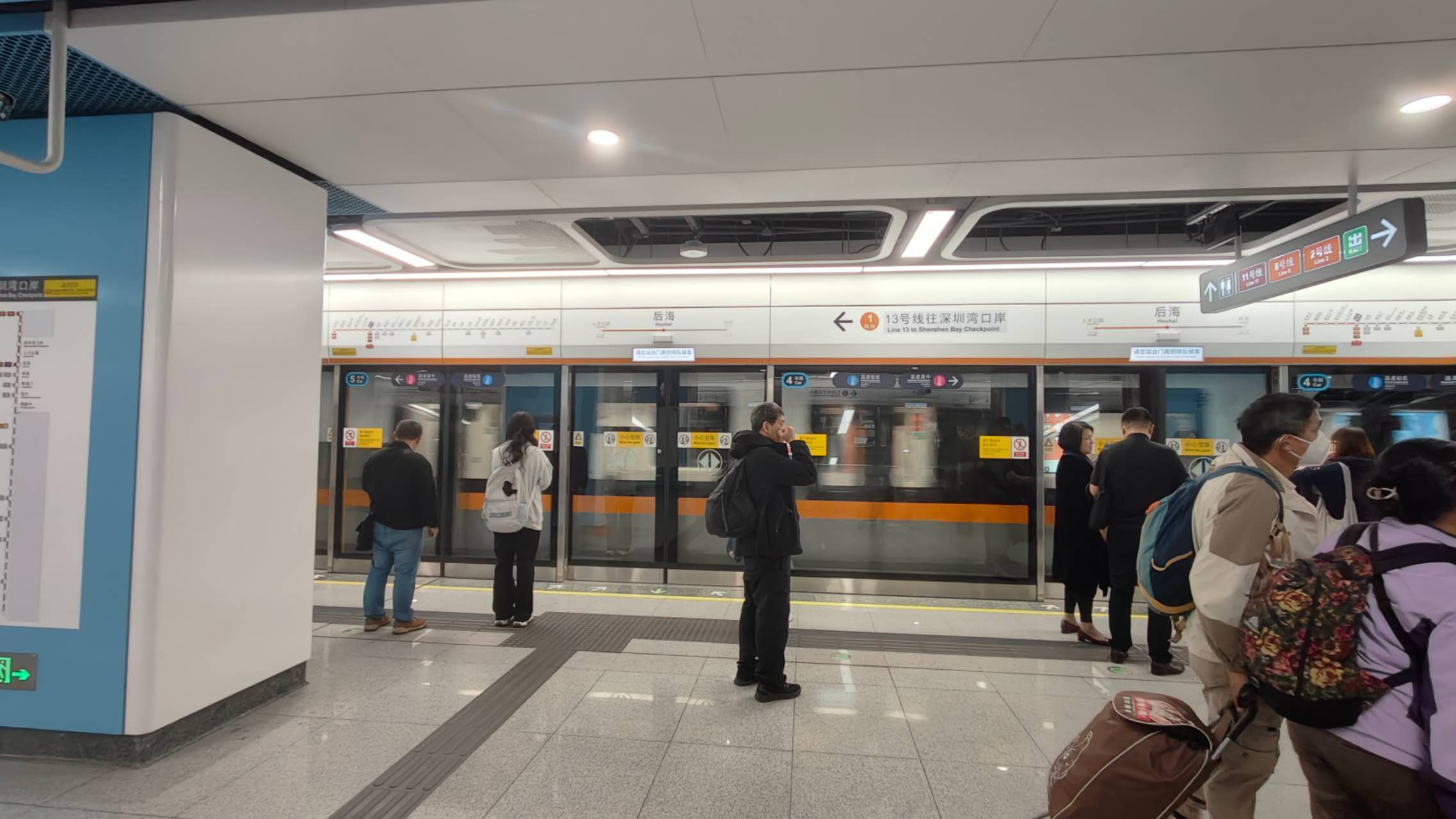
Line 13 Platforms

=== Concourses ===
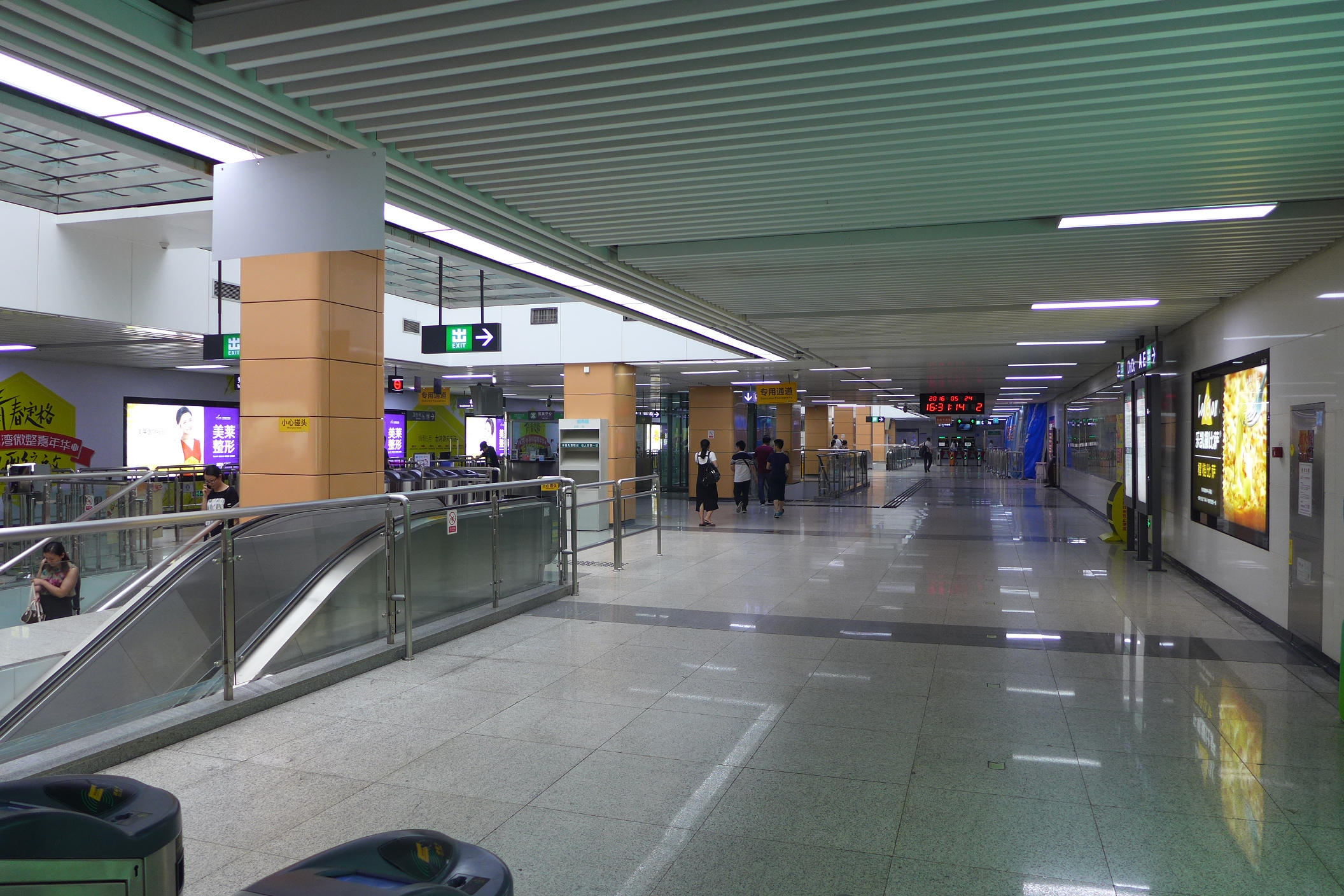
Line 2 Concourse (2016)

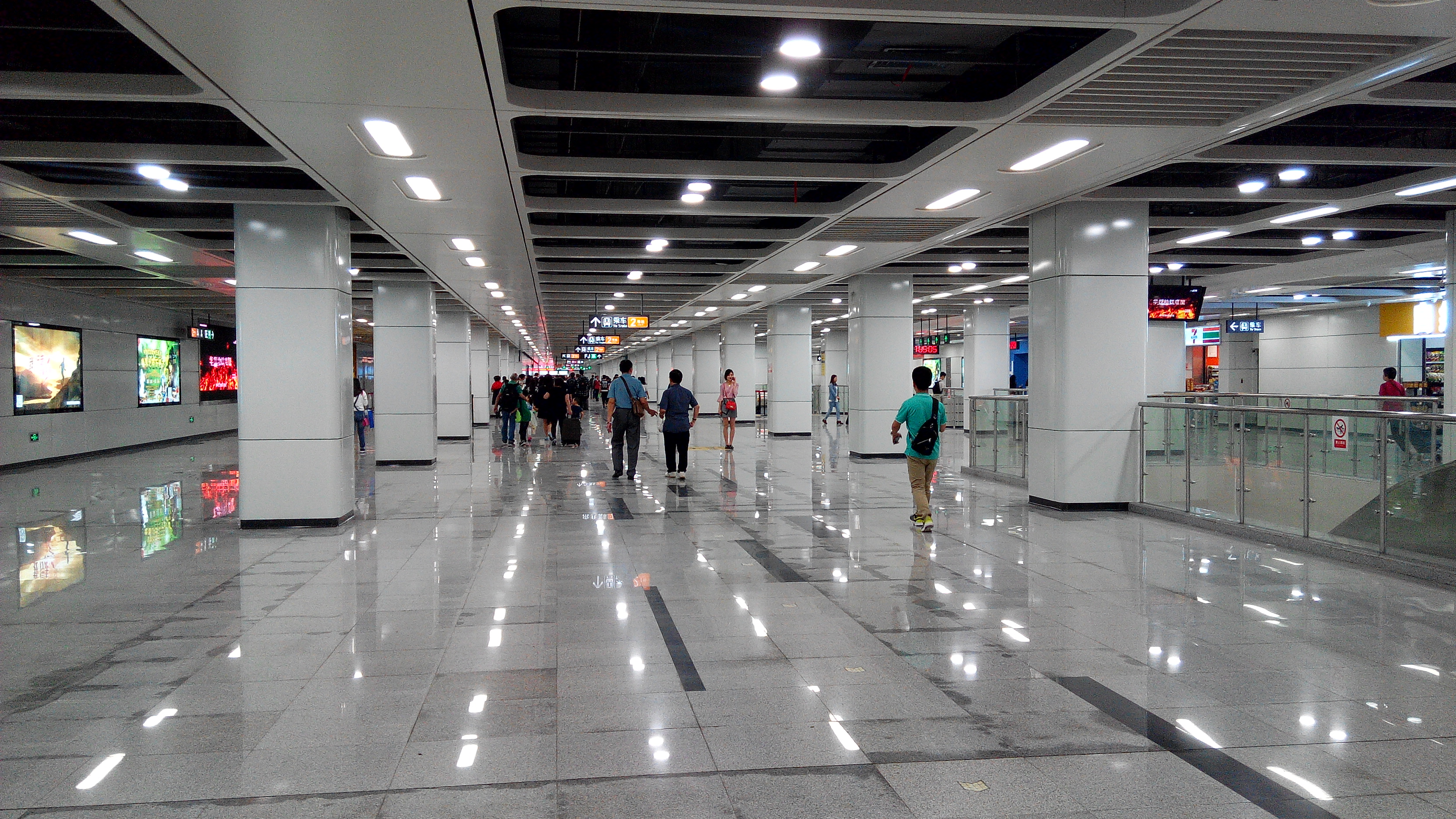
Line 11 Concourse

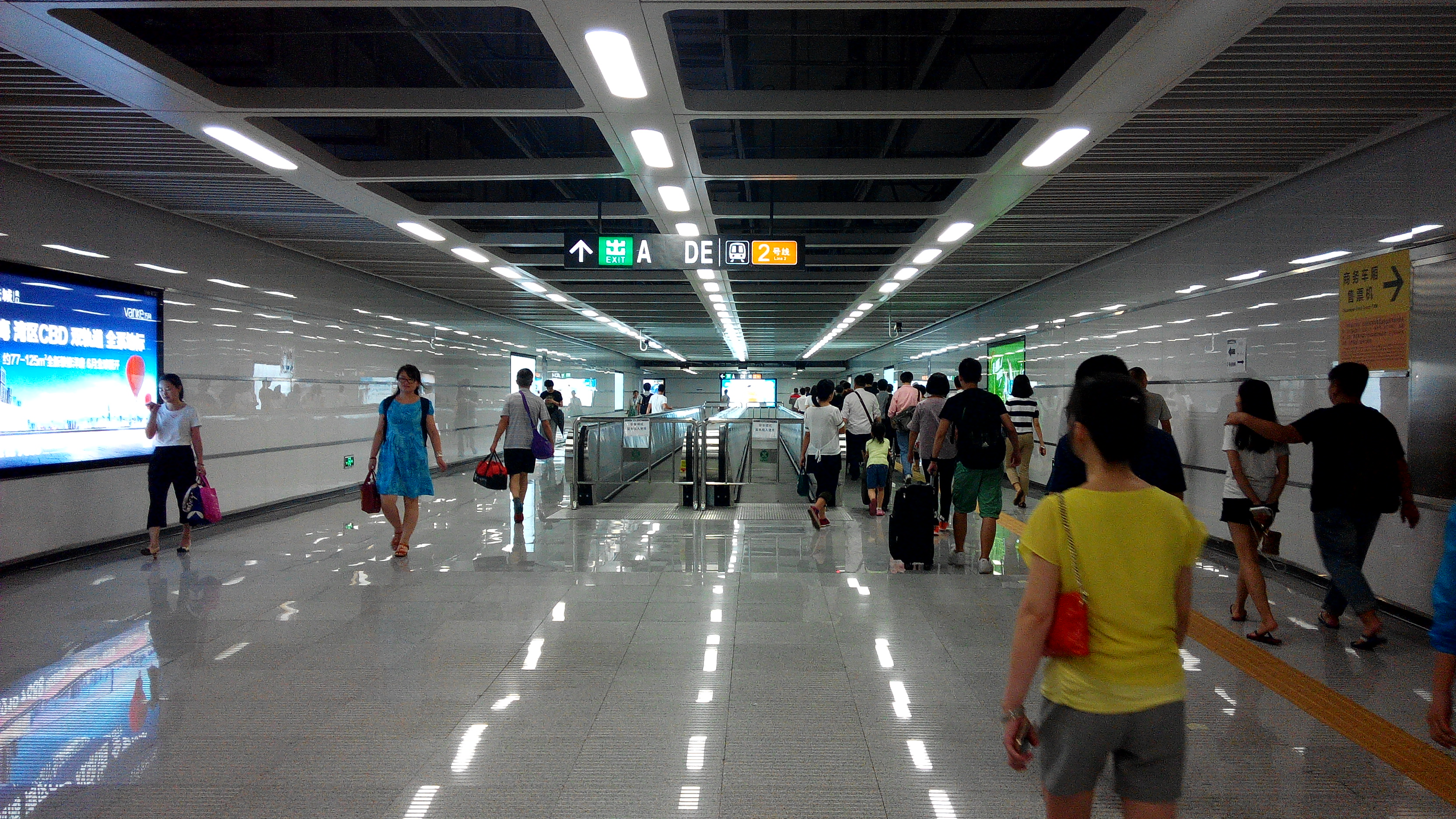
Line 2 & Line 11 Transfer Concourse

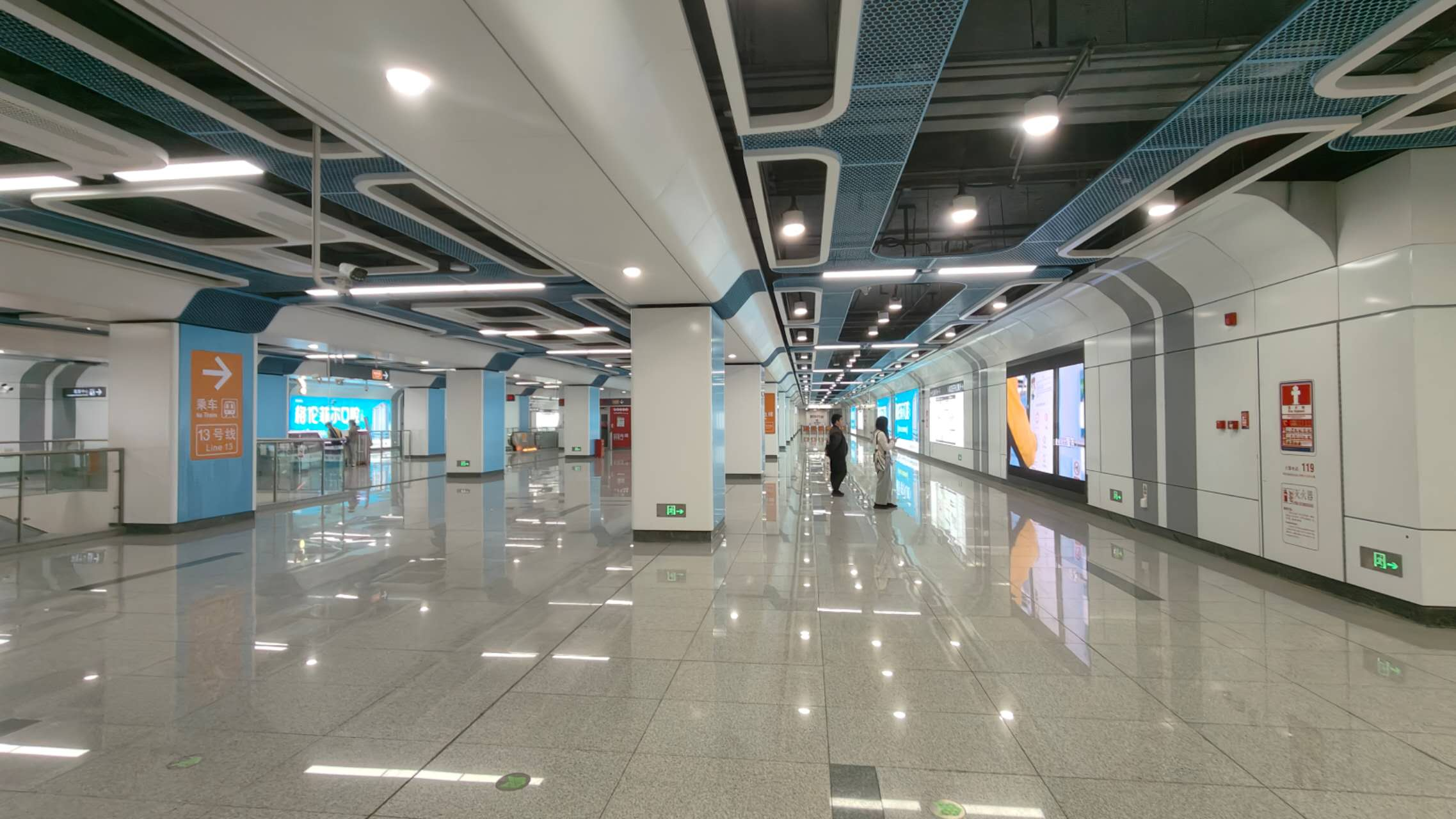
Line 13 Concourse

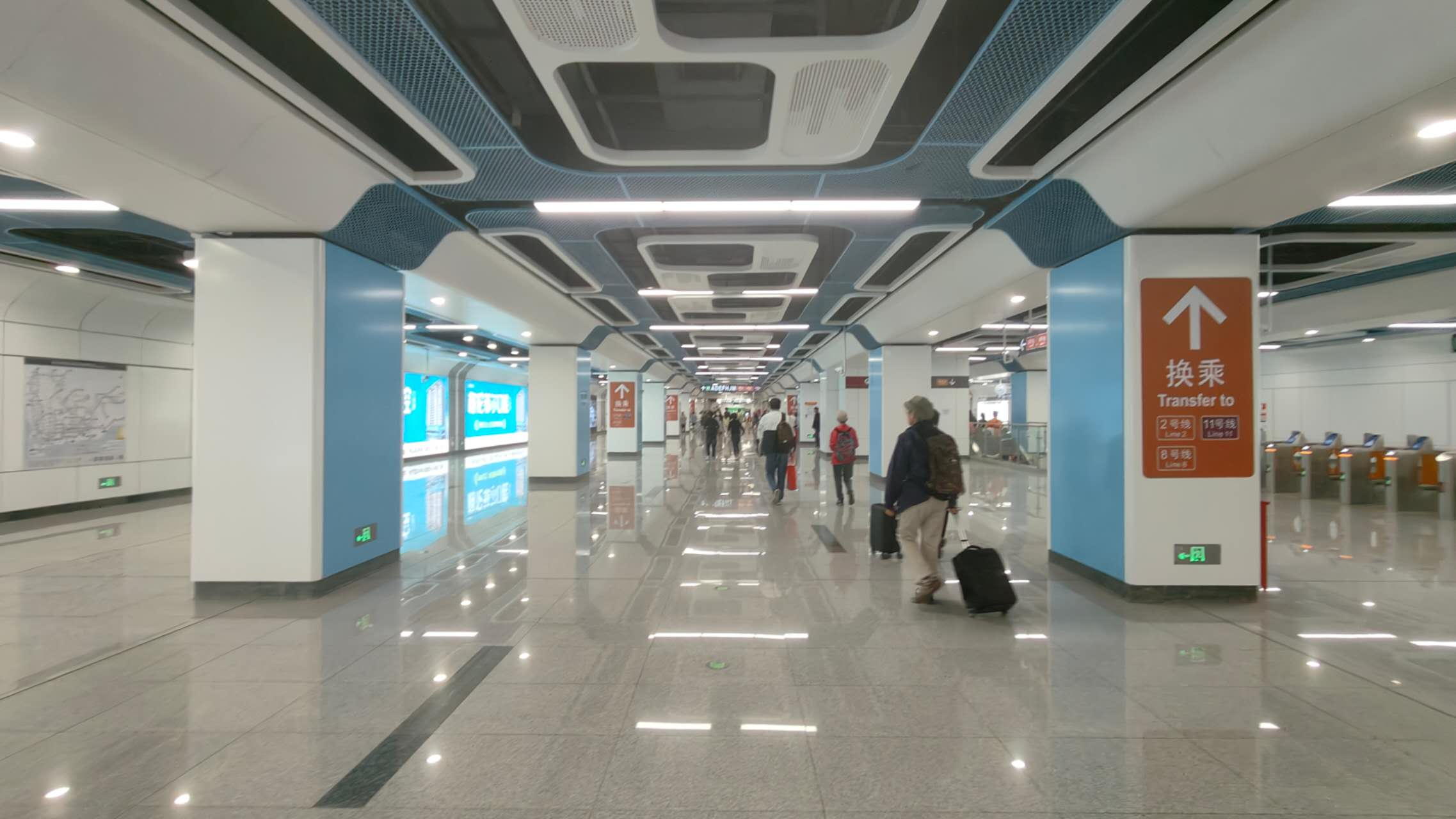
Line 13 Concourse (With Transfer Poster)

== Exits ==
Exit letter		Destination
A		Houhaibin Road (E), Shenzhenwan Sports Center
D	D	Wing Hang Bank (China), Kempinski Hotel Shenzhen, Coastal City Shopping Center
D	D1	Haide 2nd Road, Houhaibin Road (W), Nanshan Donor Center, Poly Cultural Centre, Wing Hang Bank (China), Coastal Group (Coastal Building), Coastal City Shopping Center
D	D2	Houhaibin Road (W), Poly Cultural Centre, Kempinski Hotel Shenzhen, Second Foreign Languages School of Nanshan, Sunrise Bay
E	E	Houhaibin Road (W), Coastal City Shopping Center, Poly Cultural Centre, Xuefu Middle School, Houhai Rainbow Department Store, Sundan
E	E1	Houhaibin Road (W), Coastal City Shopping Center, Houhai Rainbow Department Store, Poly Cultural Centre, Poly Theatre, Nanshan Book Mall, Xuefu Middle School, Guanhaitai, Sundan
E	E2	Carrefour
F		Houhaibin Road (E), Haide 3rd Street (S), Guanhaitai Garden, Pengrunda Building
G		Zhongxin Road (W), Haide 3rd Road (S), Hisense South Headquarters, CREC Nanfang Headquarters Building, Fortune Bay Mansion
H		Haide 3rd Road (N), Shenzhenwan Sports Center
J		Binhai Boulevard (S), Haide 3rd Street (N), Second Foreign Languages School of Nanshan, Aerospace Science and Technology Square, China Aerospace Science & Technology Building
L		Nanshan Center Road (E)
M		Haide 3rd Street (N)

== Trivia ==
- Houhai Station in Traditional Chinese is also "后海站", not "後海站".
