= Callison =

US-based architecture firm

Coordinates: 47.610568°N 122.33475°W

- Company type: Private
- Founded: 1975, Seattle, Washington, U.S.
- Defunct: October 2015
- Fate: Merged with RTKL Associates to form CallisonRTKL
- Successor: CallisonRTKL
- Headquarters: U.S. Bank Center; Seattle, Washington, U.S.
- Area served: Worldwide
- Key people: Lance Josal, CEO
- Services: Architecture; Interior Design; Graphic Design; Strategic Consulting; Real Estate Strategies; Master Planning; Brand Experience
- Number of employees: 900 (2012)
- Website: www.callison.com

Callison was an international architecture firm based in Seattle, Washington. Callison was founded by Tony Callison in 1975 and grew to 900 employees around the world prior to its acquisition by Arcadis NV in 2014. In October 2015, Callison was formally merged with another Arcadis subsidiary, RTKL Associates, to form CallisonRTKL headquartered in Baltimore, Maryland.

Callison planned and designed retail, hospitality, mixed-use, workplace, corporate and healthcare projects worldwide.

== Corporate ==
From its founding in Seattle in 1975, the company grew to over 900 employees worldwide, with offices across the globe: Seattle, Los Angeles, Mexico City, Dallas, Scottsdale, New York City, London, Dubai, Beijing, Shanghai and Guangzhou.

In August 2014, Callison announced it would be acquired by Arcadis NV, a global design, engineering and management consulting firm based in Amsterdam.

Shortly after the acquisition Arcadis began marketing Callison together with another recent acquisition, Baltimore-based RTKL, with a combined "CallisonRTKL" website and press releases. In October 2015, the two firms were formally merged to form CallisonRTKL headquartered in Baltimore, Maryland. At the time of the merger, the two firms together had together booked $402.4 million in architecture and engineering revenue in the prior year, and Architectural Record ranked the combined firms fifth in the nation.

Callison has been recognized with awards for design, architecture, and green design.

== Notable projects ==
- Tata New Haven - Bangalore, India
- Inorbit Hyderabad - Hyderabad, India
- Hongyi Plaza - Shanghai, China
- FlatIron Crossing Mall - Broomfield, Colorado
- The Pearl Island – Porto Arabia - Doha, Qatar
- W Hotel - Seattle, Washington
- Unitech Grande - Noida, India
- Coastal City - Shenzhen, China
- Harvey Nichols - Dubai and Jakarta
- Boeing World Headquarters - Chicago, Illinois
- 2201 Westlake - Seattle, Washington
- Grand Gateway - Shanghai, China
- Sogo - Osaka, Japan
- Swedish Medical Center, Eastside Specialty Center - Issaquah, Washington
- Hotel Terra - Jackson Hole, Wyoming
- The Bravern - Bellevue, Washington
- Harrods White Cosmetics Hall - London, England
- St. Charles Medical Center Redmond - Redmond, Oregon
- Microsoft Campus - Redmond, Washington
- Greenbelt 3 - Manila, Philippines
- Lotte Center Hanoi - Hanoi, Vietnam
- Nordstrom - Since 1975 Callison has provided the retailer (both companies are based in Seattle) the design for more than 155 new and remodeled stores; and continues to complete 10 projects, on average, every year for the company.
