= Talent Park station =

Shenzhen Metro Line 13 station

Talent Park 人才公园
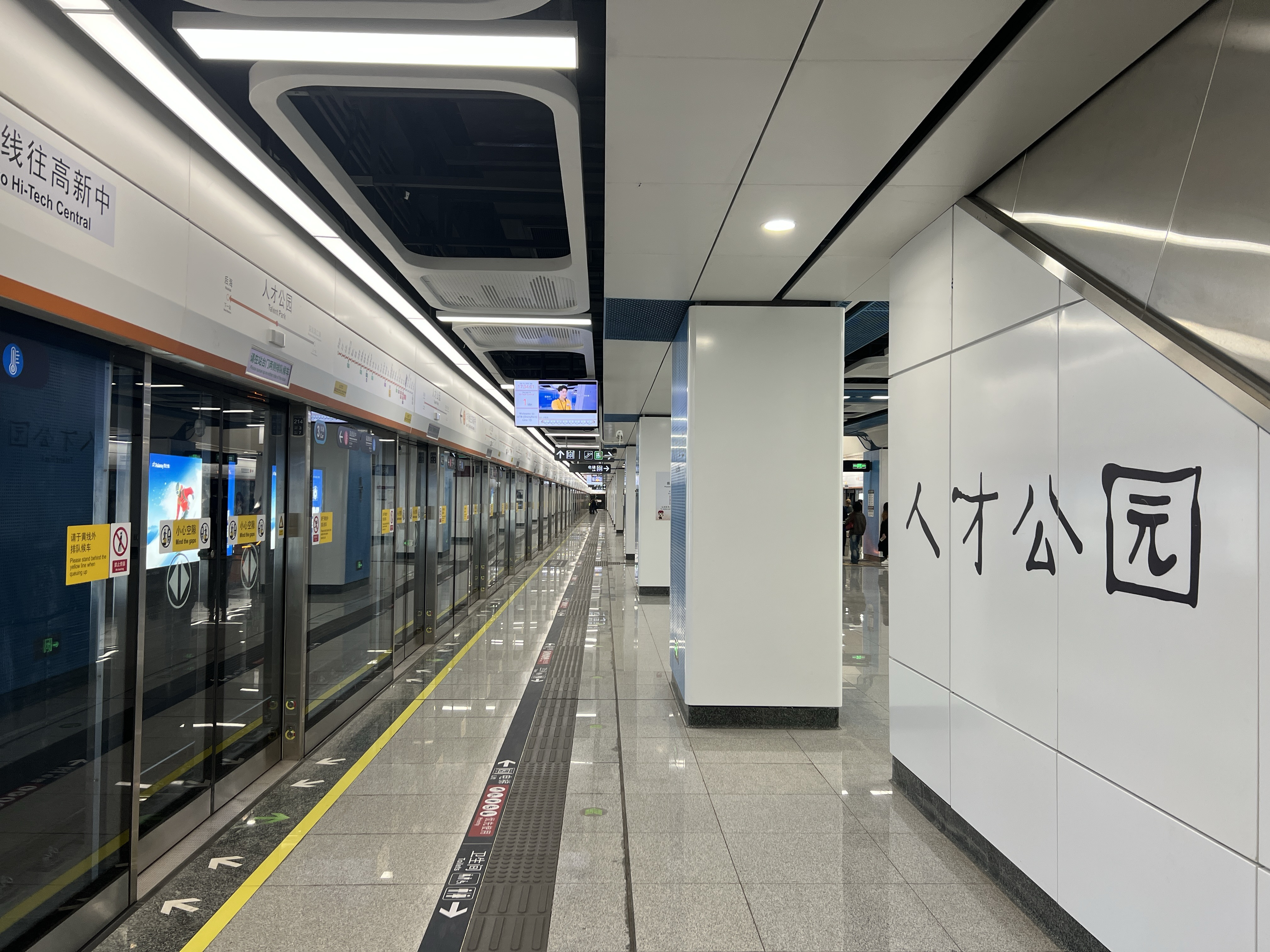
- Platform

Chinese name
- Simplified Chinese: 人才公园
- Traditional Chinese: 人才公園
Transcriptions
Standard Mandarin
- Hanyu Pinyin: Réncái Gōngyuán
Yue: Cantonese
- Yale Romanization: Yàhnchòih Gūng'yún
- Jyutping: Jan4 Coi4 Gung1 Jyun4

General information
- Location: Intersection of Keyuan Road (科苑南路) and Cuangye Road (创业路); Nanshan District, Shenzhen, Guangdong; China
- Coordinates: 22°30′54″N 113°56′18″E
- Operated by: MTR China Railway Electrification Rail Transit (Shenzhen) Co., Ltd (MTR Rail Transit (Shenzhen) Co., Ltd. and China Railway Electrification Bureau Group Co., Ltd.)
- Line: Line 13
- Platforms: 2 (1 island platform)
- Tracks: 2

Construction
- Structure type: Underground
- Accessible: Yes

History
- Opened: 28 December 2024 (18 months ago)
- Previous names: Dengliang East (登良东)

Services
Preceding station	Shenzhen Metro	Following station
Shenzhen Bay Checkpoint Terminus	Line 13	Houhai towards Lisonglang
Location

Talent Park station (Chinese: 人才公园站; pinyin: Réncái Gōngyuán Zhàn; Cantonese Yale: Yàhnchòih Gūng'yún Jaahm) is a station on Line 13 of Shenzhen Metro. It opened on 28 December 2024, and is located in Nanshan District next to Shenzhen Talent Park.

There is an entrance and exit access track to and from the underground Neihu Depot in front of the north end of the station.

== Station layout ==
G	-	Exits A, B, C, D
B1F; Concourse	Lobby	Ticket Machines, Customer Service, Station Control Room
B2F	Mezzanine	Depot access tracks, Station Equipment
B3F; Platforms	Platform 1	13 towards Shenzhen Bay Checkpoint (terminus)
B3F; Platforms	Island platform, doors will open on the left
B3F; Platforms	Platform 2	13 towards Lisonglang (Houhai)

=== Gallery ===
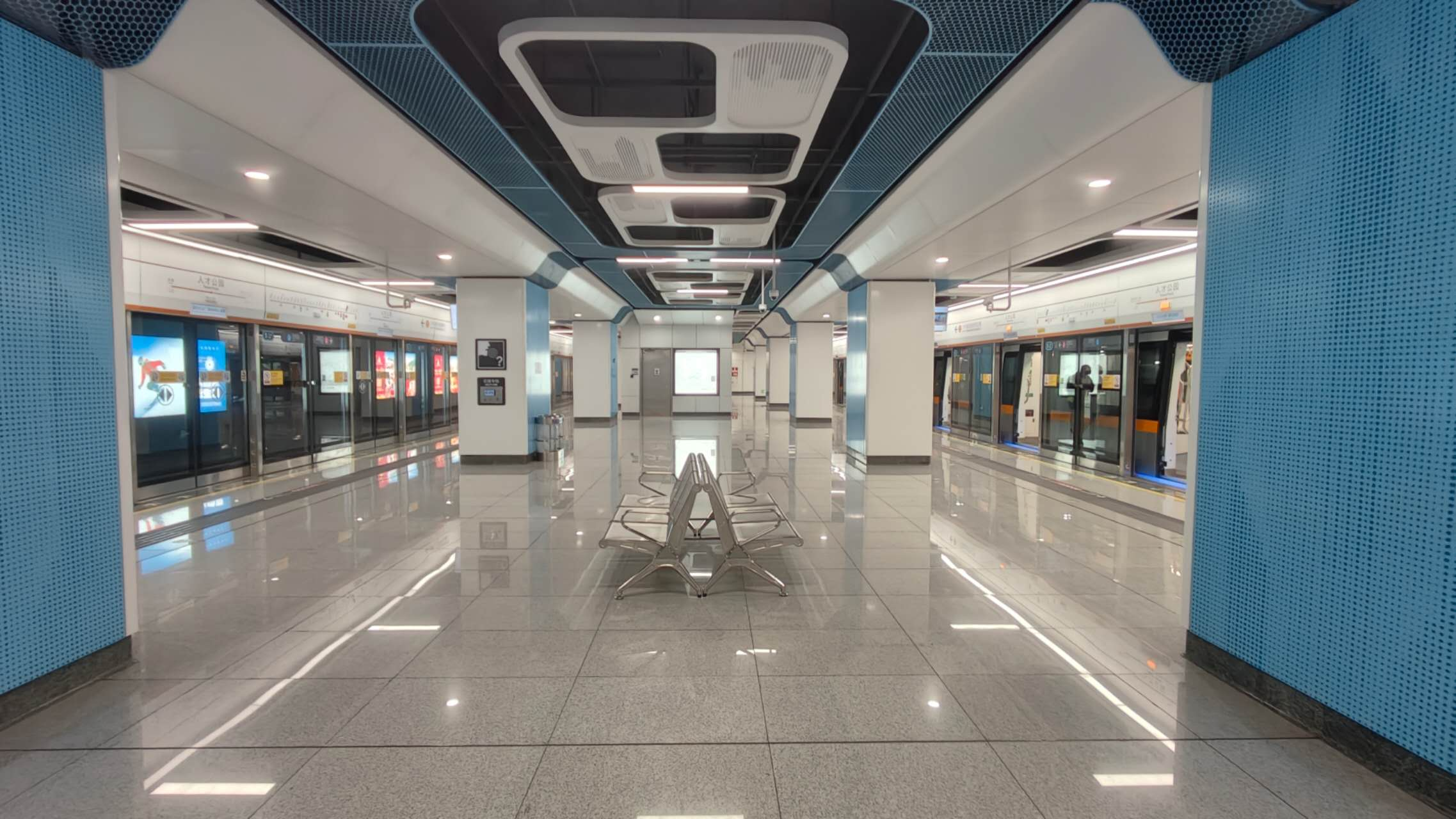
Platform

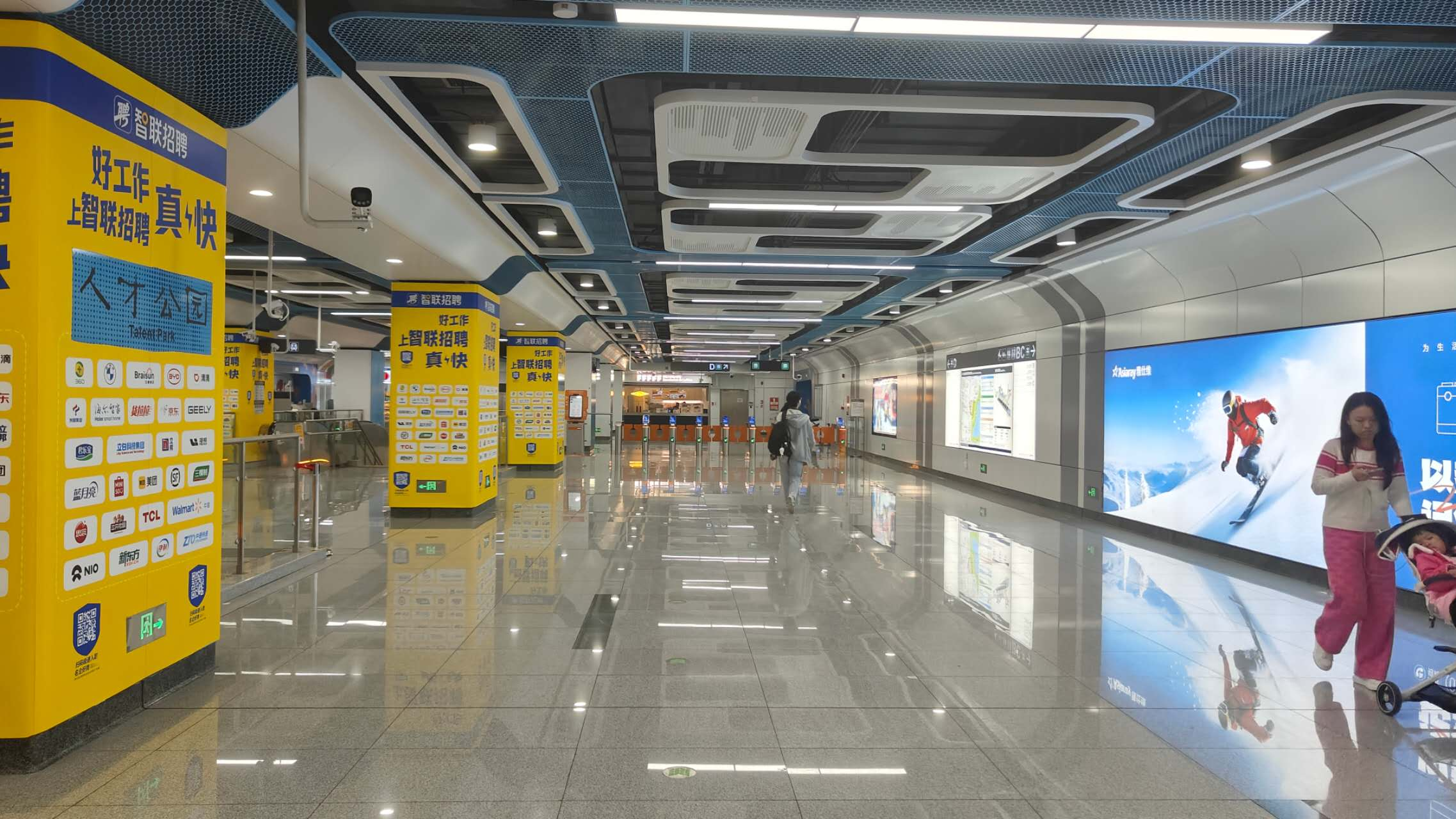
Concourse

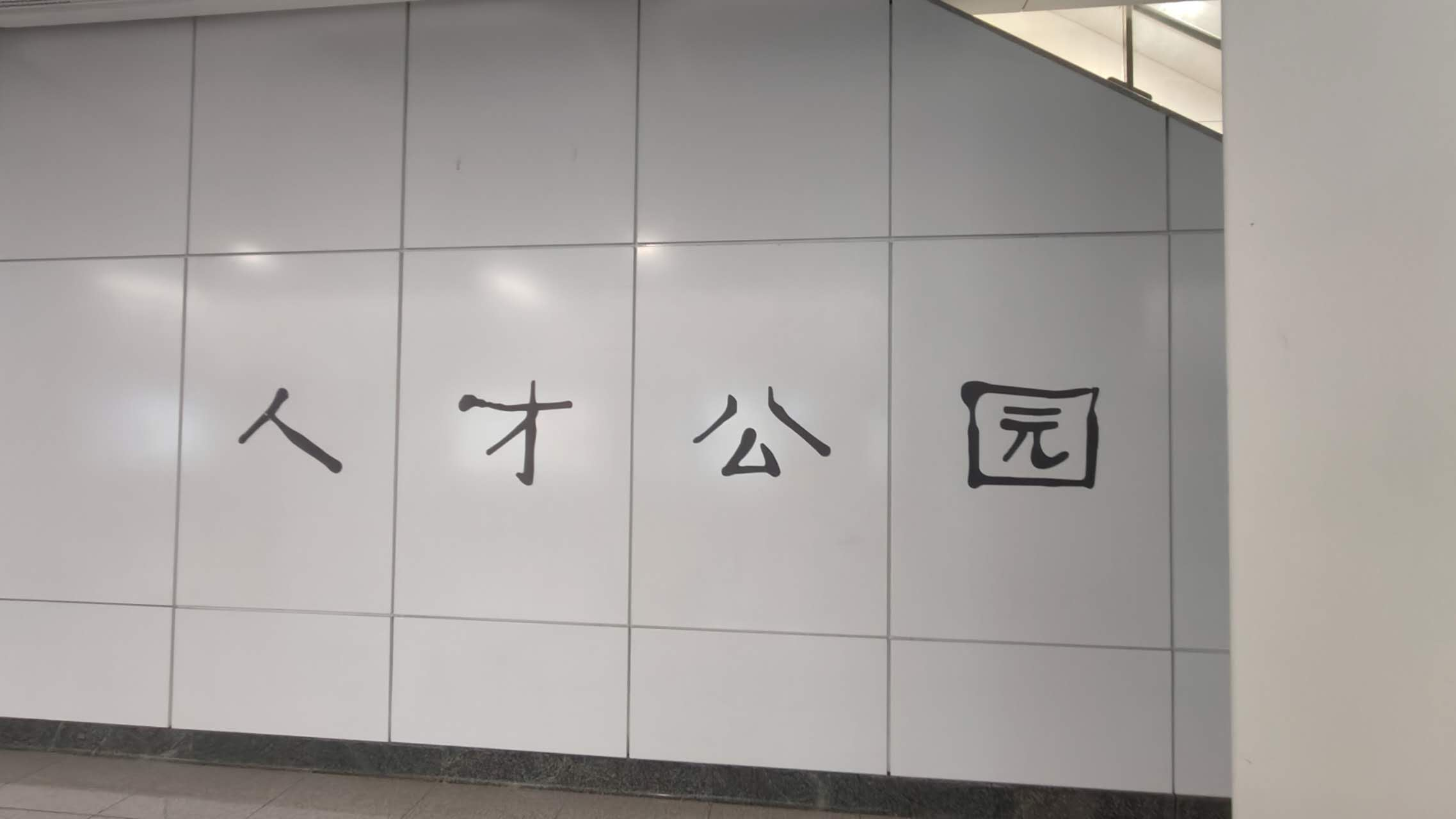
Platform calligraphy

=== Entrances/exits ===
The station has 4 points of entry/exit. Exit B is equipped with an elevator.

- : Keyuan Avenue (E)
- : Cuangye Road (N), Keyuan Road South (W)
- : Cuangye Road (W)
- : Nanshan Center Road (E)
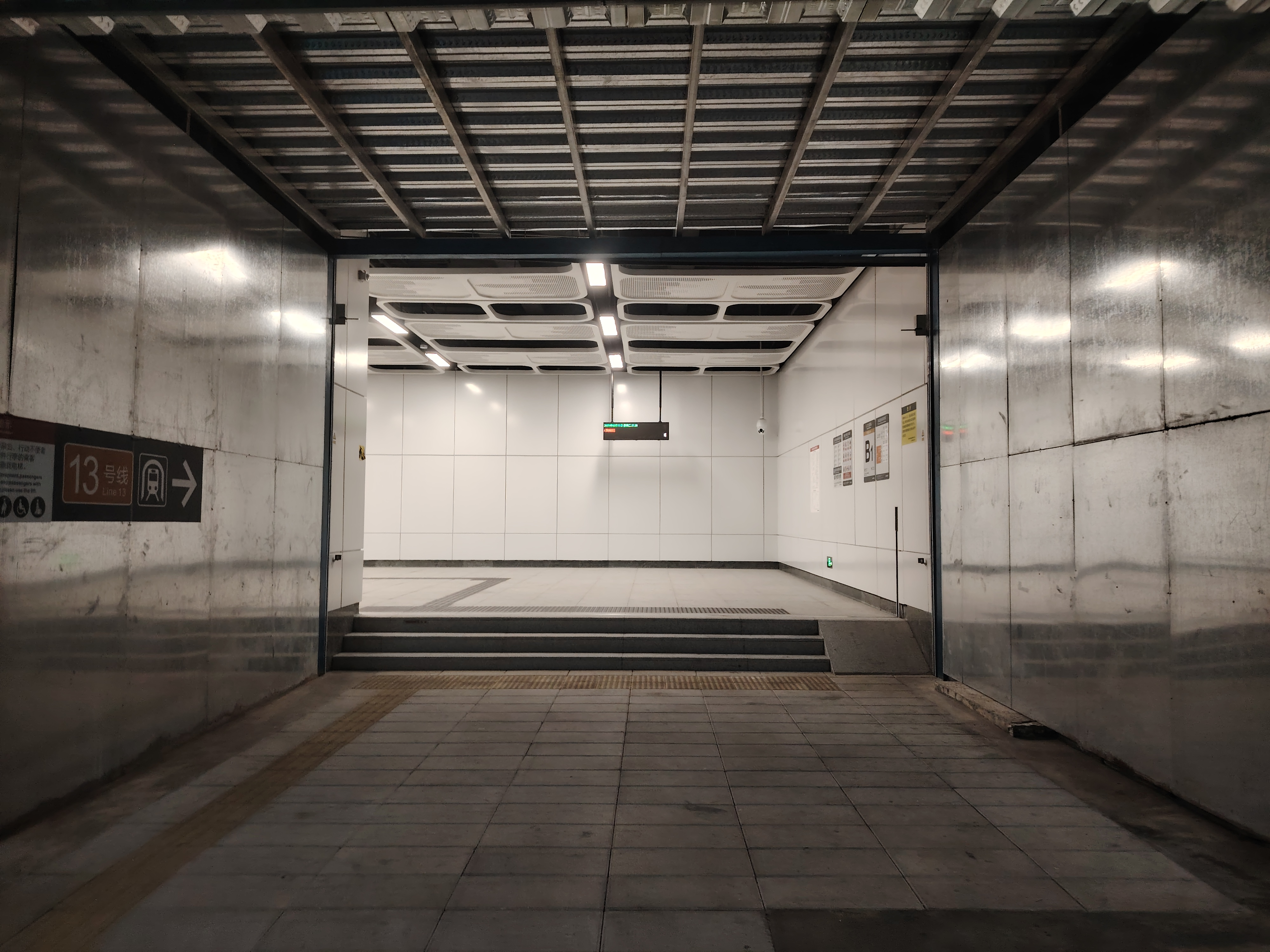
Entrance B1

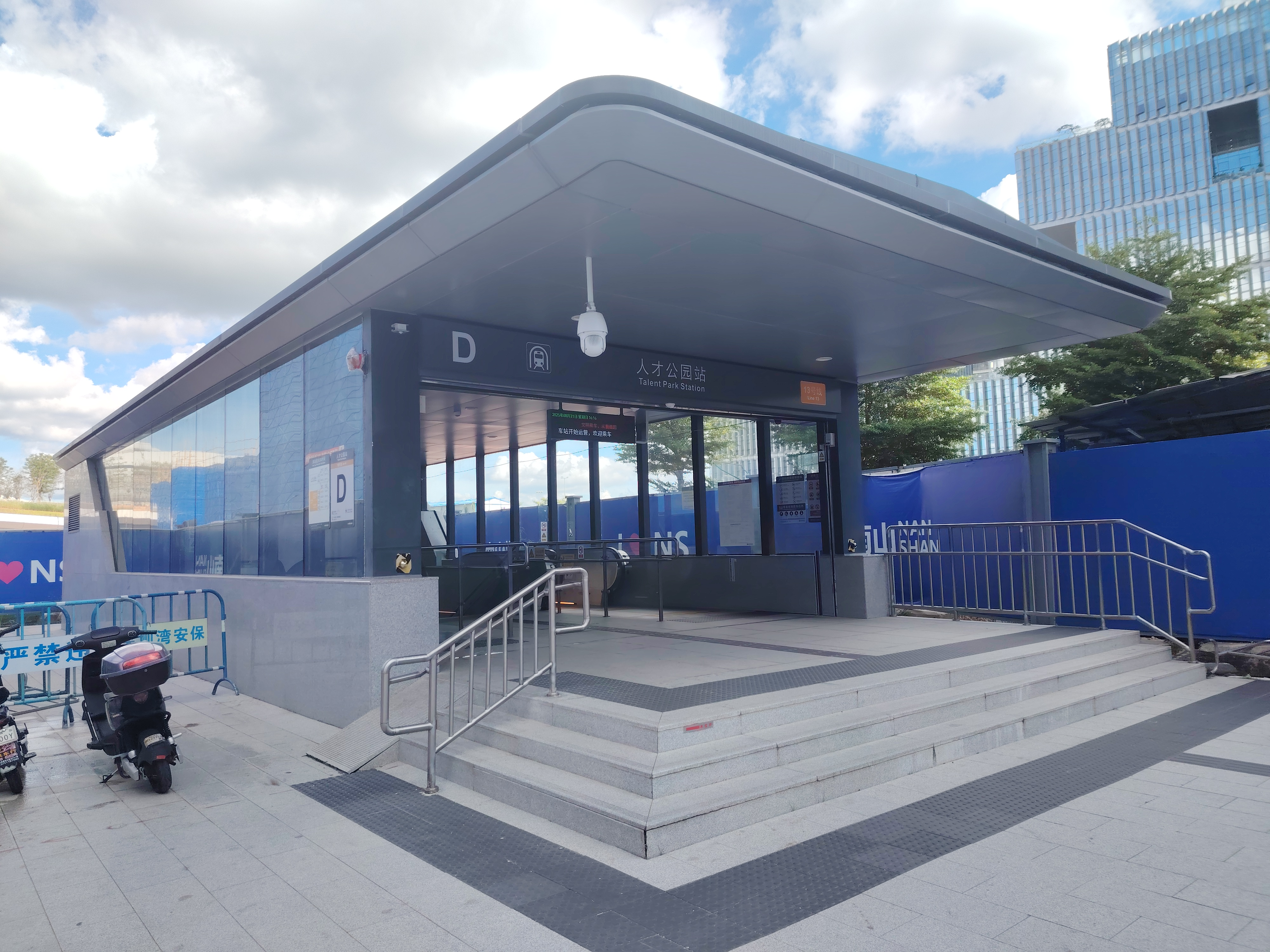
Entrance D

== Construction timeline ==
- On 26 July 2017, Shenzhen Metro Group Co., Ltd. issued the "Environmental Impact Report of Shenzhen Urban Rail Transit Line 13 Project", which includes this station, and the project is named Dengliang East Station.
- On 5 August 2019, the first acceptance of the crown beam and support beam of the station was successfully passed.
- On 27 September 2019, the concrete pouring of the first floor slab in the open-cut section between this station and Shenzhen Bay Checkpoint Station was successfully completed.
- On 16 November 2020, the left line tunnel between this station and Shenzhen Bay Port Station was successfully broken through, which is the third group of double-line sections of the whole line.
- On 27 January 2021, the acceptance of the foundation pit enclosure and foundation treatment division of this station was successfully passed.
- On 26 April 2021, the acceptance of the main structure division and the acceptance of the underground waterproof division of the station were successfully passed.
- On 29 April 2021, the station carried out the intermediate acceptance of the transfer of sub-units of the 16-30 axis/A-D axis including the plug-in part on the station hall floor, and the quality of the sub-divisions (sub-divisions) included in the acceptance scope was accepted.
- On 12 July 2021, the intermediate acceptance of the transfer of the civil engineering sub-unit project at the platform layer of this station was successfully passed.
- On 22 April 2022, the Shenzhen Municipal Bureau of Planning and Natural Resources issued the Announcement on the Approval of the Plan for the Station Names of Relevant Lines of the Fourth Phase of Shenzhen Metro, and the station was renamed from "Kexing Station" to the official station name, "Talent Park Station".
- On 2 November 2022, the main structure of entrance and exit D of this station were successfully topped out.
