= Coastal City =

- 海岸城

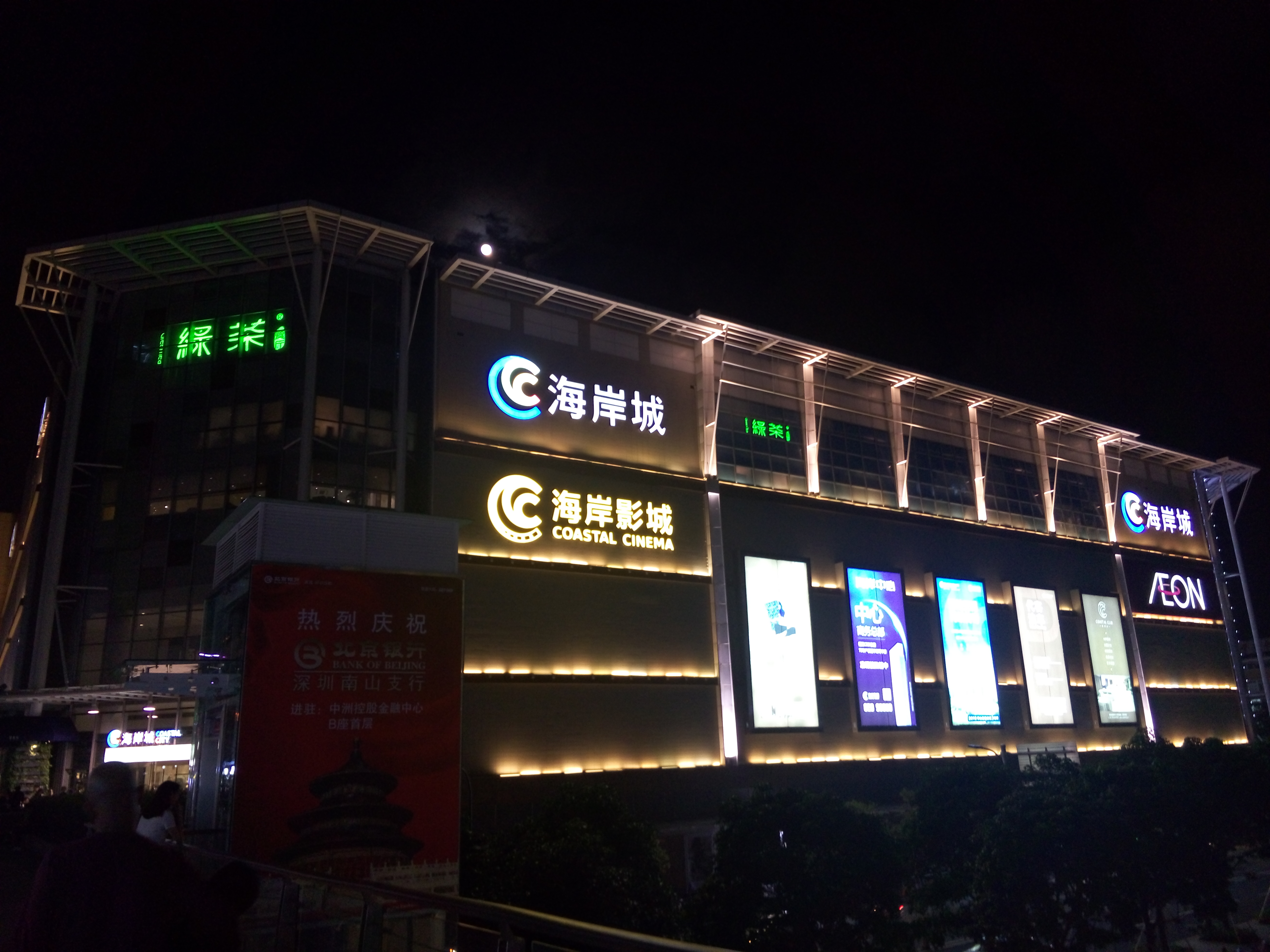
- Coastal City at night
- Location: Houhai Subdistrict, Nanshan, Shenzhen, China
- Address: No. 33, Wenxin 5th Road
- Opened: 16 December 2007
- Architect: Callison
- Num. of stores: 281
- Floors: 5 (shopping mall), 30 (west tower), 23 (east tower)
- Parking: 1,500
- Public transit: Houhai station on Shenzhen Metro or Haiya Plaza on Shenzhen Bus
- Website: http://www.coastalcity.cn/

Coastal City (Chinese: 海岸城; pinyin: Hǎi'àn Chéng; Jyutping: hoi2 ngon6 sing4) is a shopping and office complex in Nanshan District, Shenzhen, China. Located in the central business district of Nanshan, it occupies an entire city block bounded by Binhai, Nanhai, Houhai, Houhaibin and Chuangye Roads.

== Overview ==
The complex consists of the Coastal City shopping arcade and two office buildings, namely the West (30 floors) and East (24 floors) towers. The podium of the two towers hosts numerous stores as well. The entire project stands on 6000m^{2} of reclaimed land, the largest of its kind in Nanshan.

Designed by the US architectural firm Callison, the mall opened in 2007 consisting five stories. It hosts the Coastal City Cinema, an ice rink, an AEON supermarket and several dozens of smaller Chinese and international shops and restaurants.

== Nearby buildings ==
Buildings and facilities in its proximity include Heung Kong Tower, Tiley Fame City, Kempinski Shenzhen, Poly Cultural Center, Nanshan Book City, Haiya shopping mall and Shenzhen Bay Sports Center.

== Transportation ==
A bus station (Nanshan CBD station) is located directly in front of the main entrance, it serves as the terminus for bus numbers 121, 76, 80, 231, 305, 382, 353, 322, 337, J1, 229 and 72. The complex is also within walking distance from Houhai station on Shenzhen Metro.

== Gallery ==
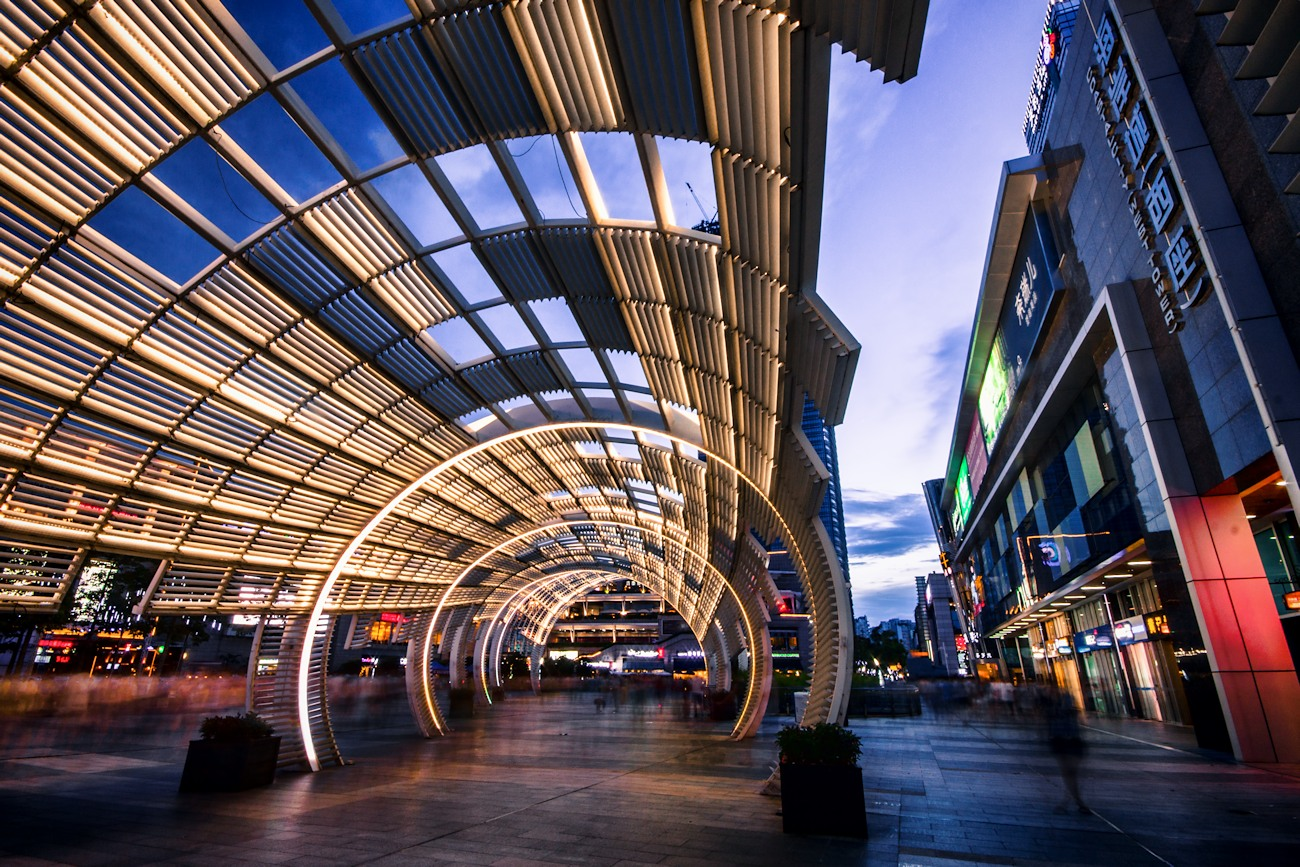

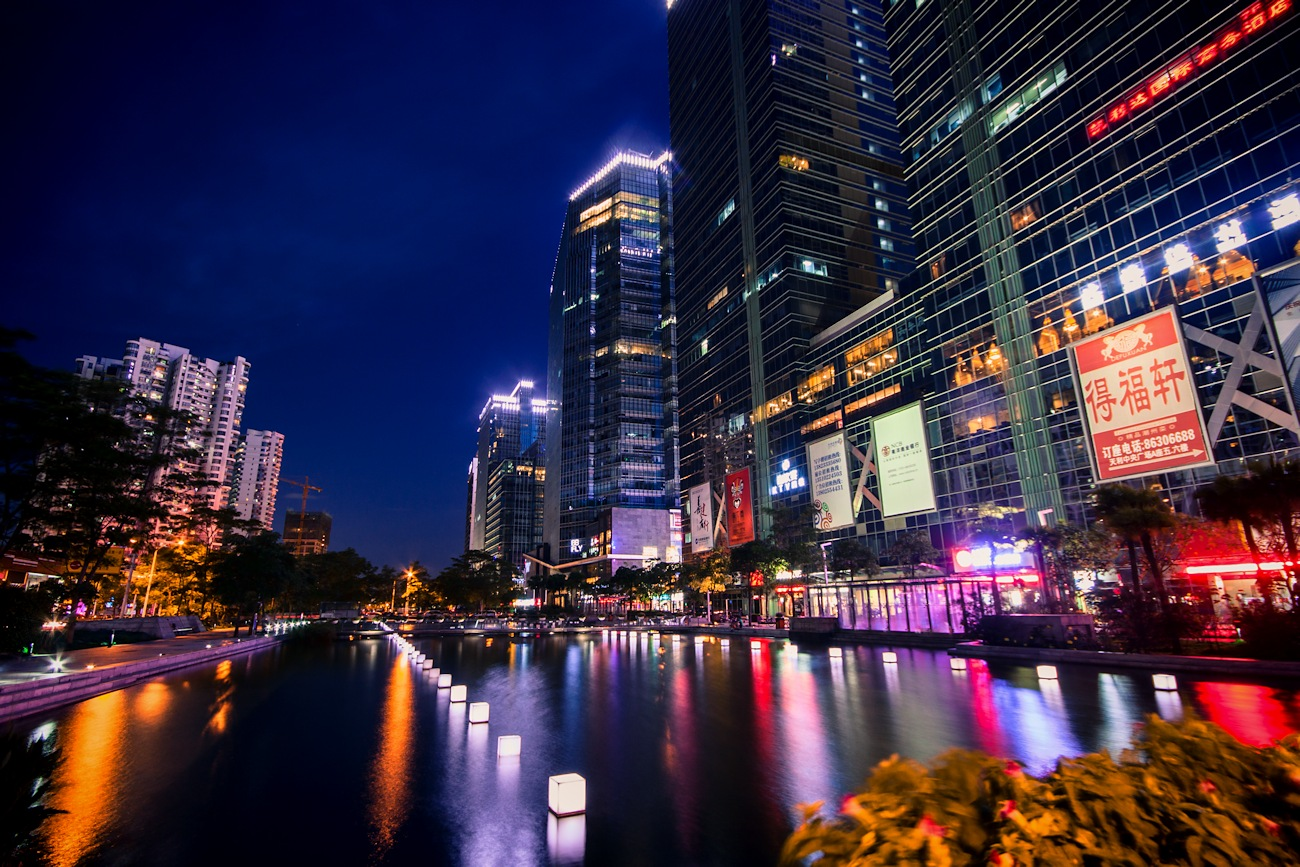
