= CallisonRTKL =

Global architecture, planning and design firm

- Industry: Architecture
- Predecessor: Callison; RTKL Associates
- Area served: Worldwide
- Key people: Kim Heartwell (CEO)
- Number of employees: 800
- Website: www.callisonrtkl.com

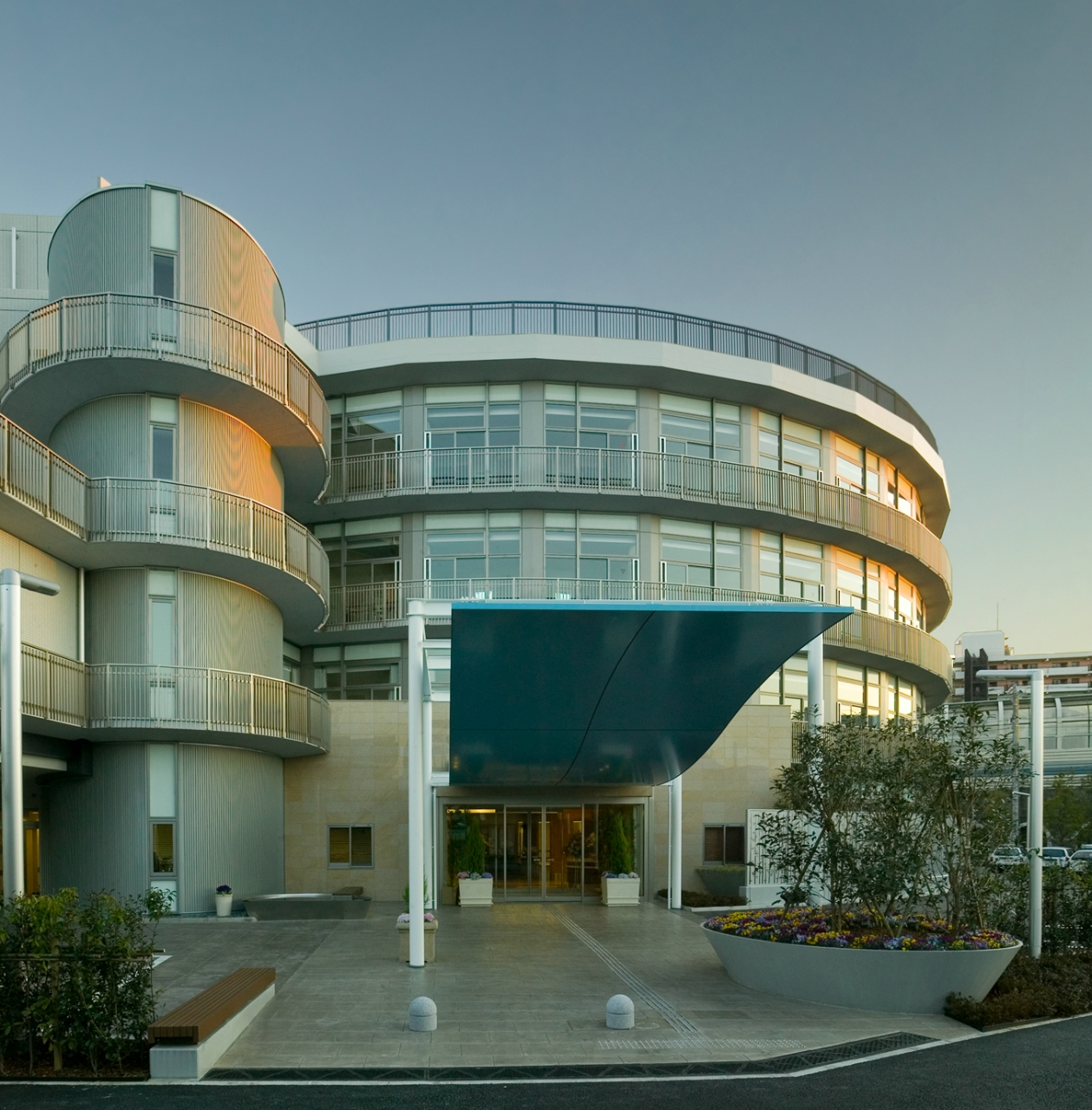
Tokyo Bay Rehabilitation Hospital, Tokyo

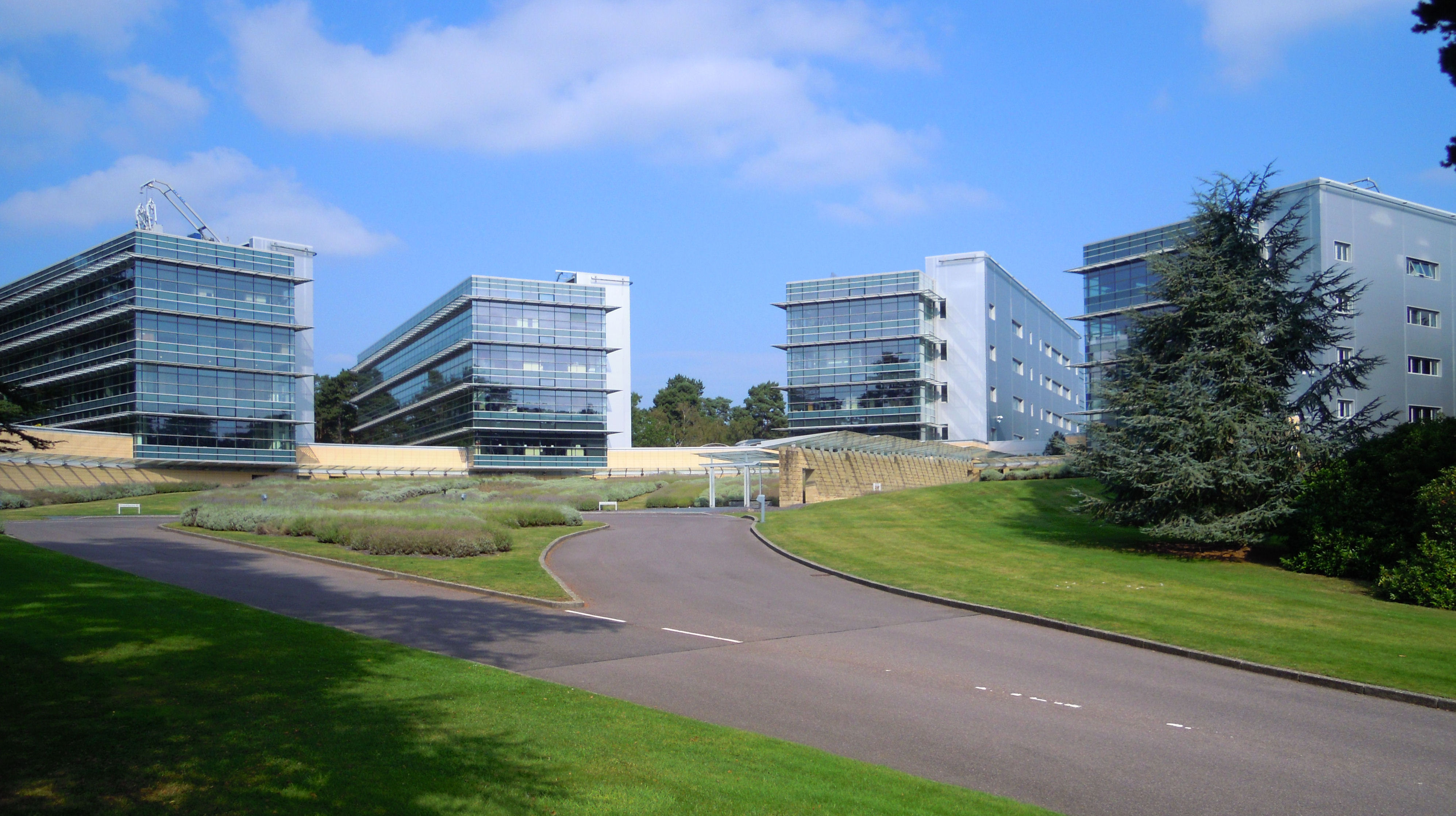
Royal Pavilion, Aldershot

CallisonRTKL is a global architecture, planning and design firm formed from the October 2015 merger of Callison and RTKL Associates, both of which were subsidiaries of Arcadis NV.

== Chief Executive Officers (Effective Date) ==
- Kim Heartwell (26 January 2021)
- Kelly Farrell (6 May 2019)
- Tim Neal (June 1, 2017)
- Lance K. Josal FAIA (1 September 2009)

== Projects ==
Chapman Taylor and CallisonRTKL have submitted plans for the £1.4 billion redevelopment of Brent Cross Shopping Centre in North West London. CallisonRTKL designed the Four Seasons Residences in Beverly Grove, Los Angeles set for completion in 2019. Its 5th and Hill project at Pershing Square in Downtown L.A. features cantilevered, glass-bottomed swimming pools projecting from the building's envelope.
