= Shenzhen Bay Checkpoint station =

Shenzhen Metro Line 13 station

Shenzhen Bay Checkpoint 深圳湾口岸
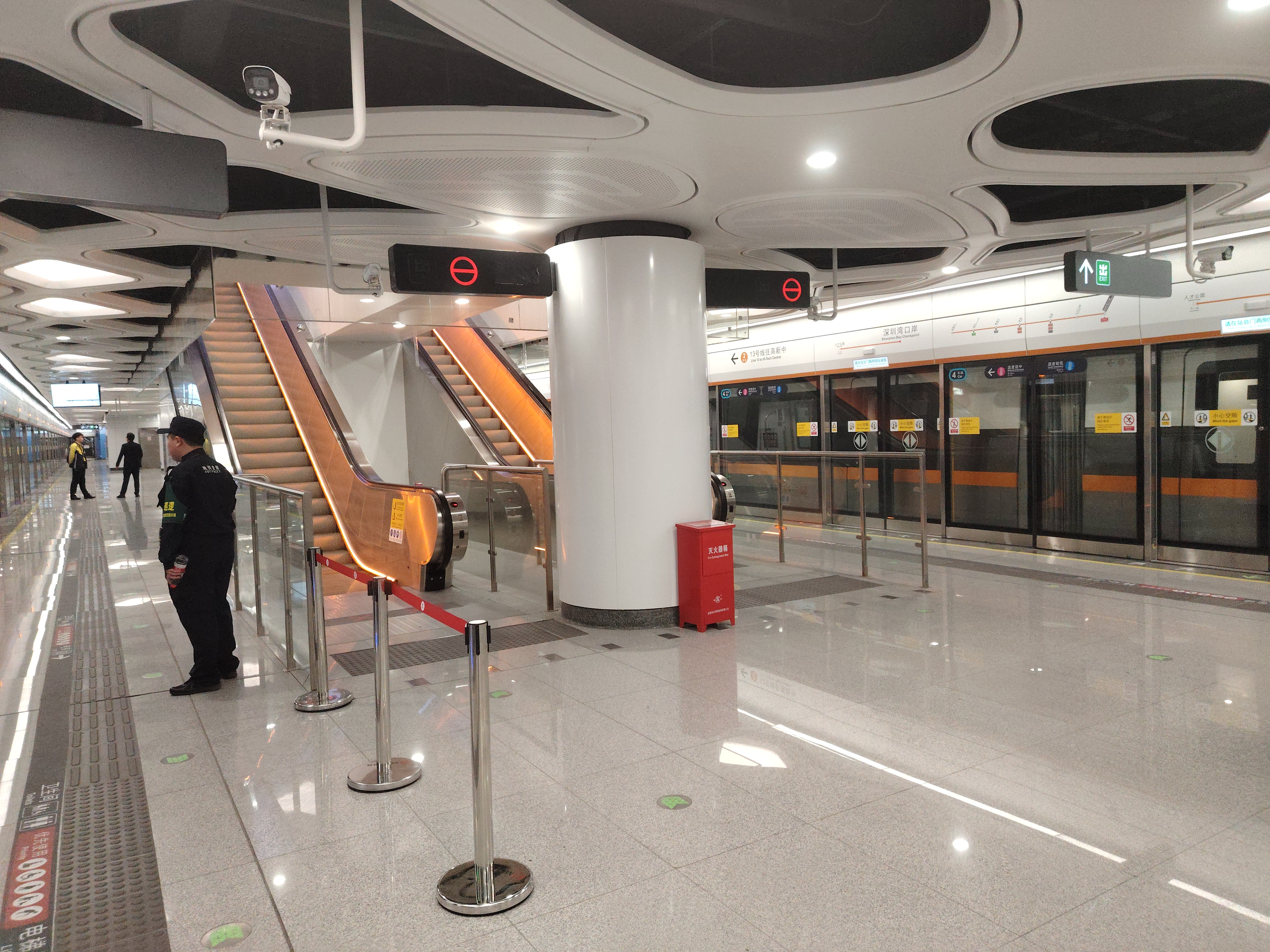
- Platform

Chinese name
- Simplified Chinese: 深圳湾口岸
- Traditional Chinese: 深圳灣口岸
Transcriptions
Standard Mandarin
- Hanyu Pinyin: Shēnzhènwān Kǒuàn
Yue: Cantonese
- Yale Romanization: Sāmjamwāan Háuohng
- Jyutping: Sam1zan3waan1 Hau2ngon6

General information
- Location: Inside the Shenzhen Bay Checkpoint Transportation Hub; Nanshan District, Shenzhen, Guangdong; China
- Coordinates: 22°30′22″N 113°56′41″E
- Operated by: MTR China Railway Electrification Rail Transit (Shenzhen) Co., Ltd (MTR Rail Transit (Shenzhen) Co., Ltd. and China Railway Electrification Bureau Group Co., Ltd.)
- Line: Line 13
- Platforms: 4 (1 island platform and 2 side platforms)
- Tracks: 2

Construction
- Structure type: Underground
- Accessible: Yes

History
- Opened: 28 December 2024 (18 months ago)

Services
Preceding station	Shenzhen Metro	Following station
Terminus	Line 13	Talent Park towards Lisonglang
Location

Shenzhen Bay Checkpoint station (Chinese: 深圳湾口岸站; pinyin: Shēnzhènwān Kǒuàn Zhàn; Cantonese Yale: Sāmjamwāan Háuohng) is a station on Line 13 of Shenzhen Metro. It opened on 28 December 2024, and is located in Nanshan District on the north side of Shenzhen Bay Port. It serves the Shenzhen Bay Port and its transportation hub.

Due to the relative position of the two ends of the station and the limitation of the radius of the curve, the station is not parallel to the road above, but adopts an oblique arrangement similar to Luohu Station with a certain angle. The station is also the most difficult station to construct on the whole Line 13.

== Station layout ==
G	-	Shenzhen Bay Port Transportation Hub, Exits, Bus and Coach Terminus, Taxi Stands, Wind Shafts
B1F; Concourse	Lobby	Ticket Machines, Customer Service, Station Art, Safety Facilities, Shops, Station Control Room, Equipment Room
B3F; Platforms
B3F; Platforms	Side platform, doors will open on the right for alighting only
B3F; Platforms	Platform 3 ↑ Platform 1 ↓	13 towards Lisonglang (Talent Park)
B3F; Platforms	Island platform, doors will open on the left for boarding only
B3F; Platforms	Platform 2 ↑ Platform 4 ↓	13 towards Lisonglang (Talent Park)
B3F; Platforms	Side platform, doors will open on the right for alighting only
B3F; Platforms	-	Platform monitoring kiosk

=== Entrances/exits ===
The station has 3 points of entry/exit. All exits are equipped with elevators.

- : Wanghai Road, Shenzhen Bay Park
- : Wanghai Road, Shenzhen Bay Port Passenger Clearance Building, Shenzhen Bay Port Passenger Clearance Building (Rental Station)
- : Wanghai Road, Shenzhen Bay Port Passenger Clearance Building, Shenzhen Bay Port Passenger Clearance Building (Transport Interchange), Shenzhen Bay Port Public Transport Exchange Office
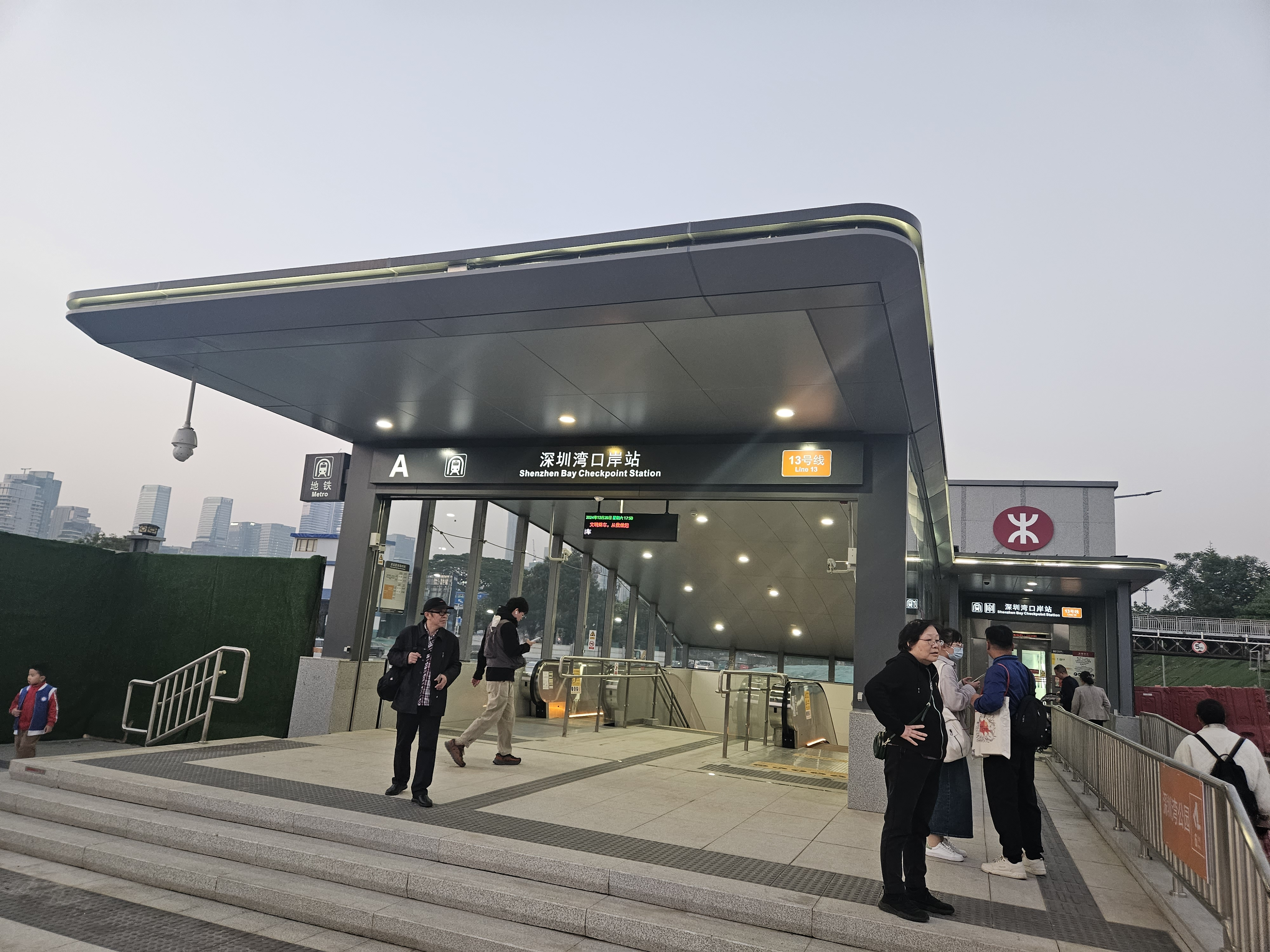
Entrance A

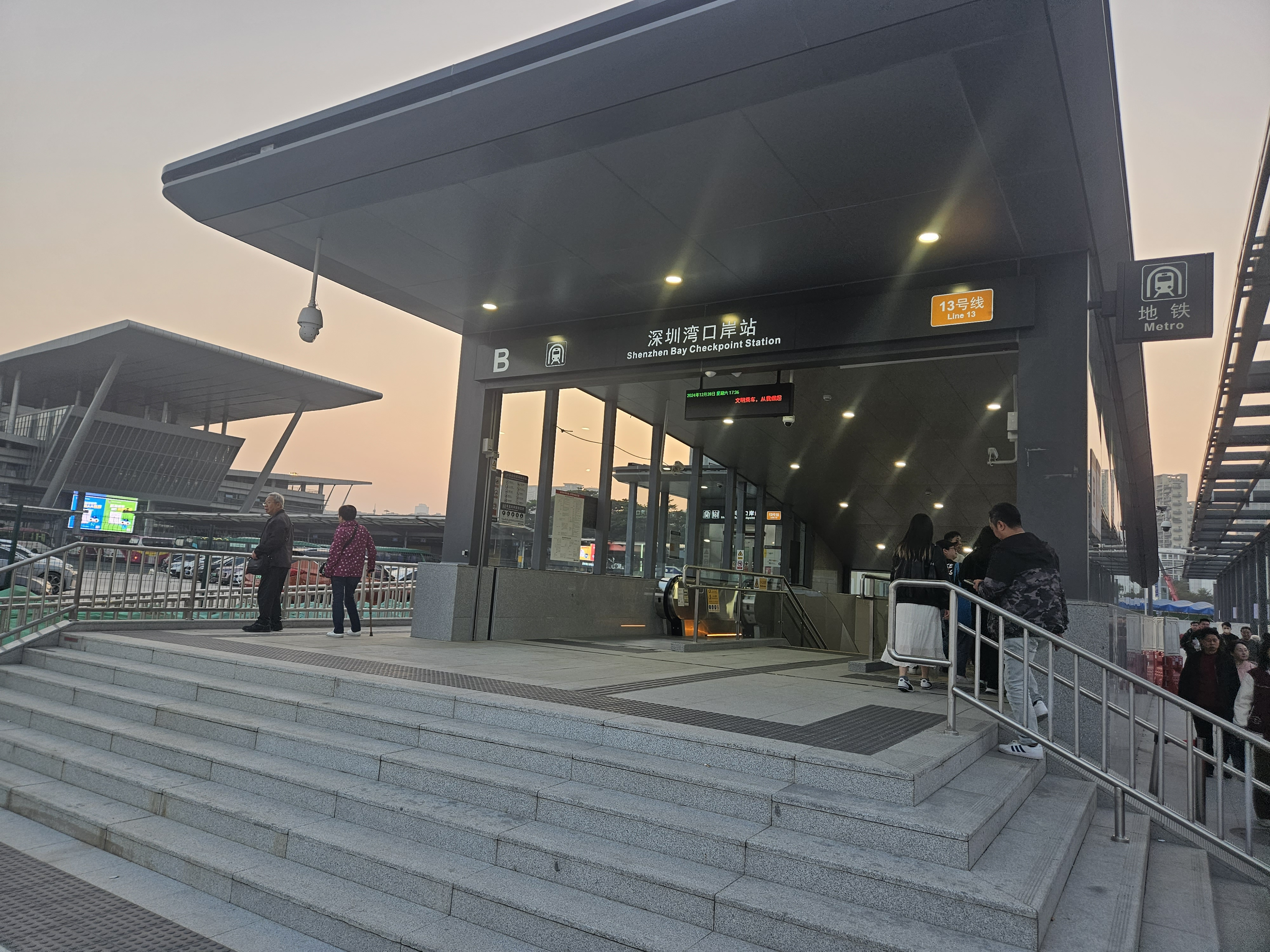
Entrance B

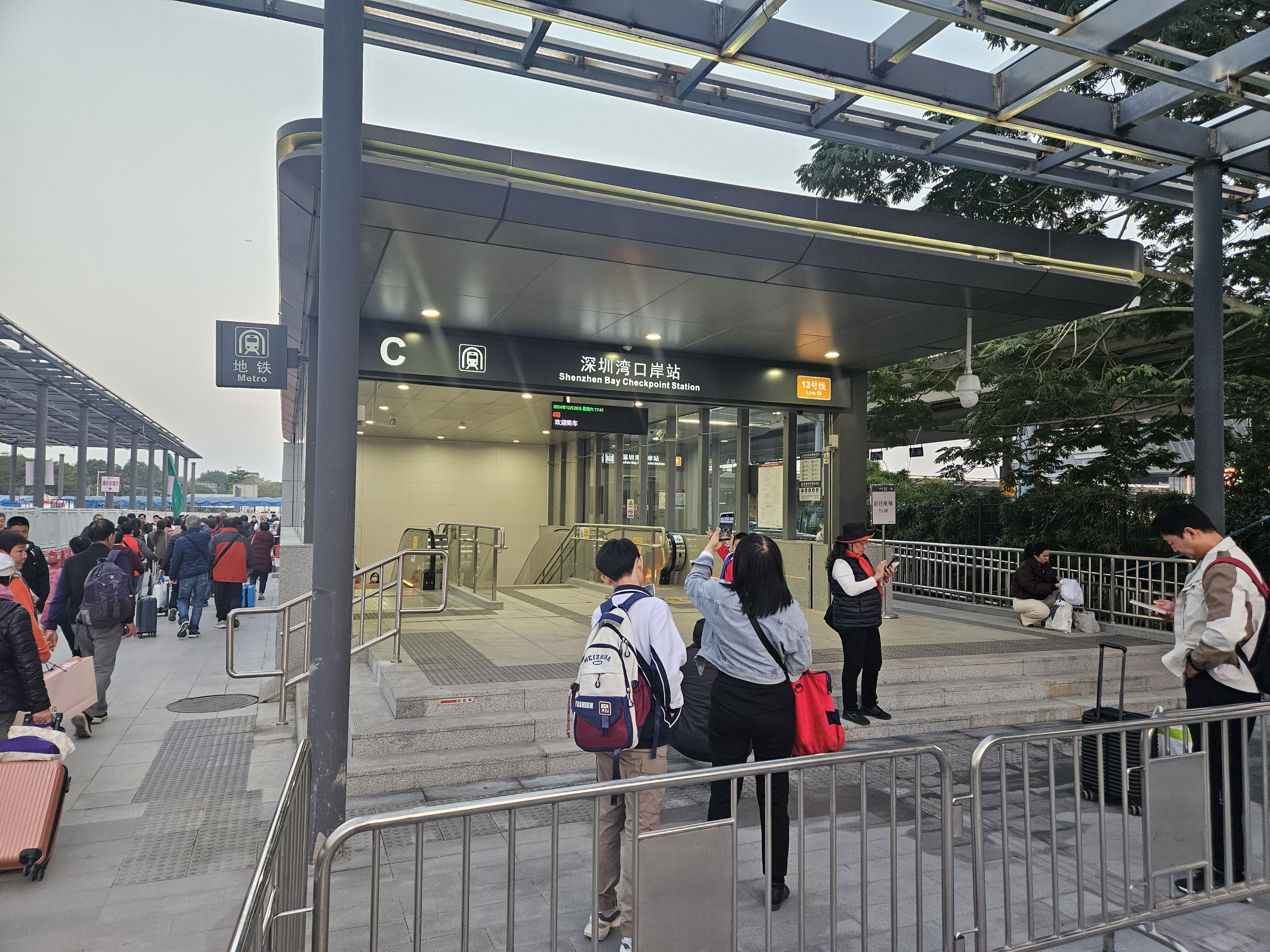
Entrance C

== Gallery ==
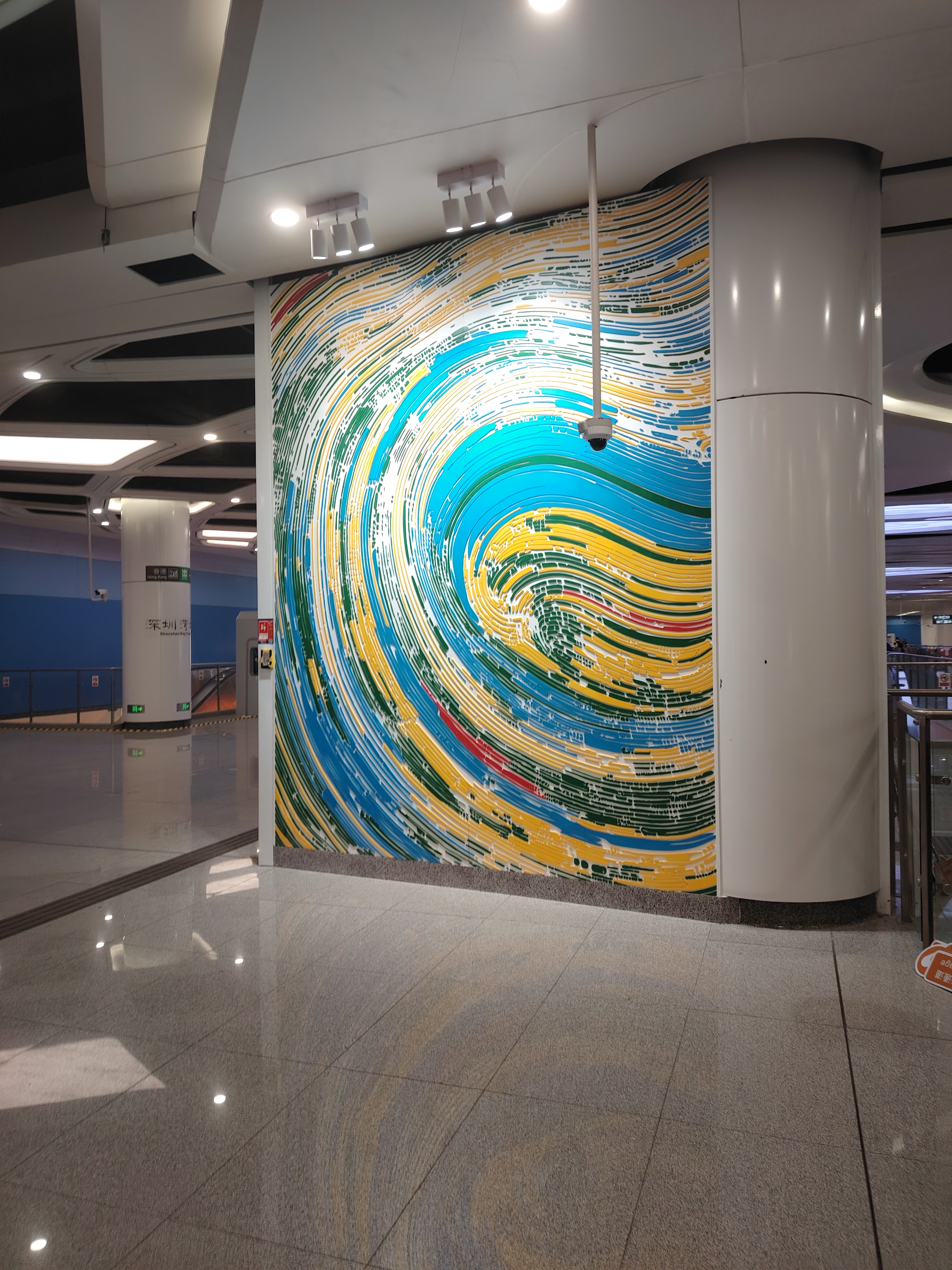
Station art

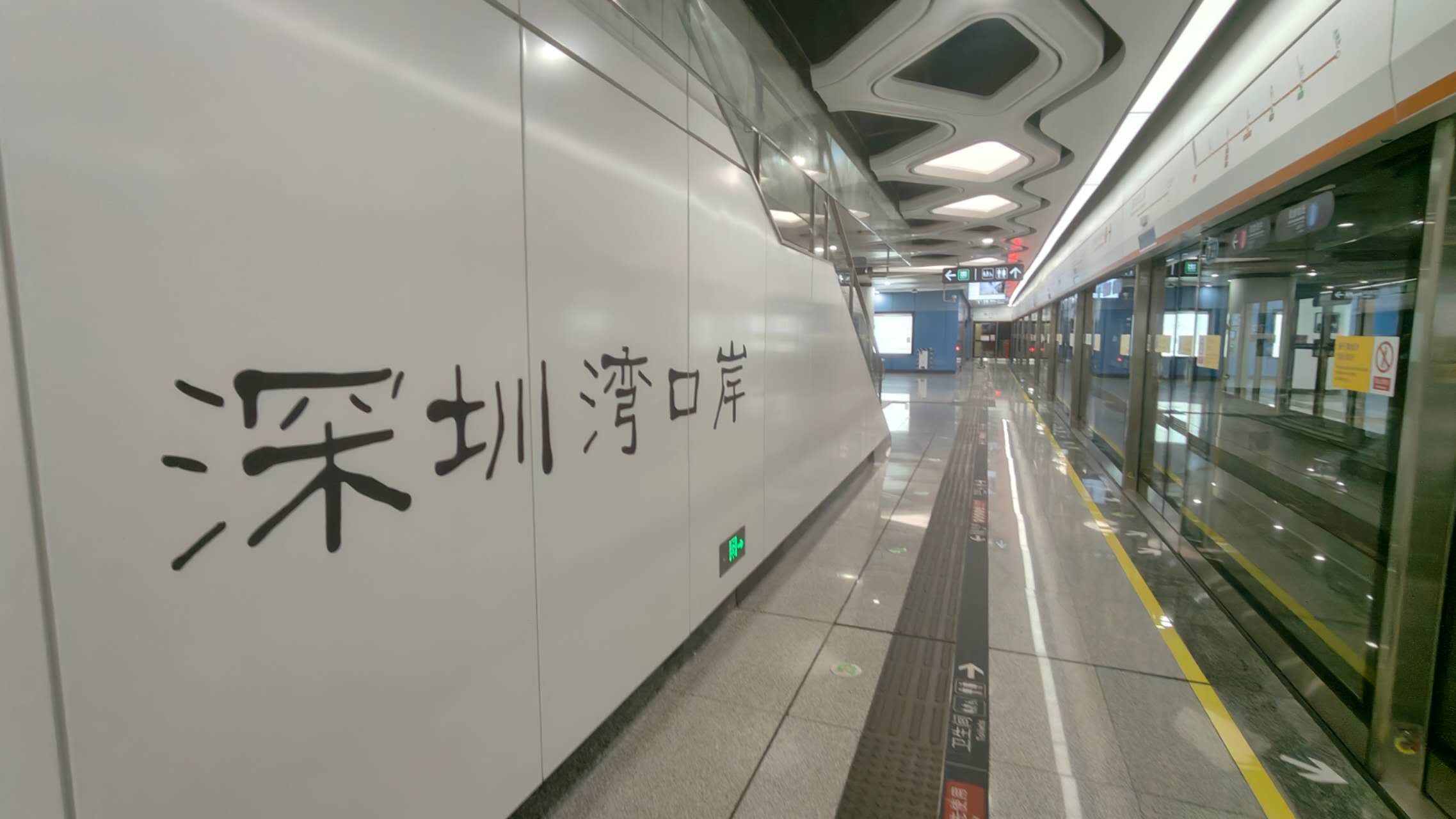
Calligraphy

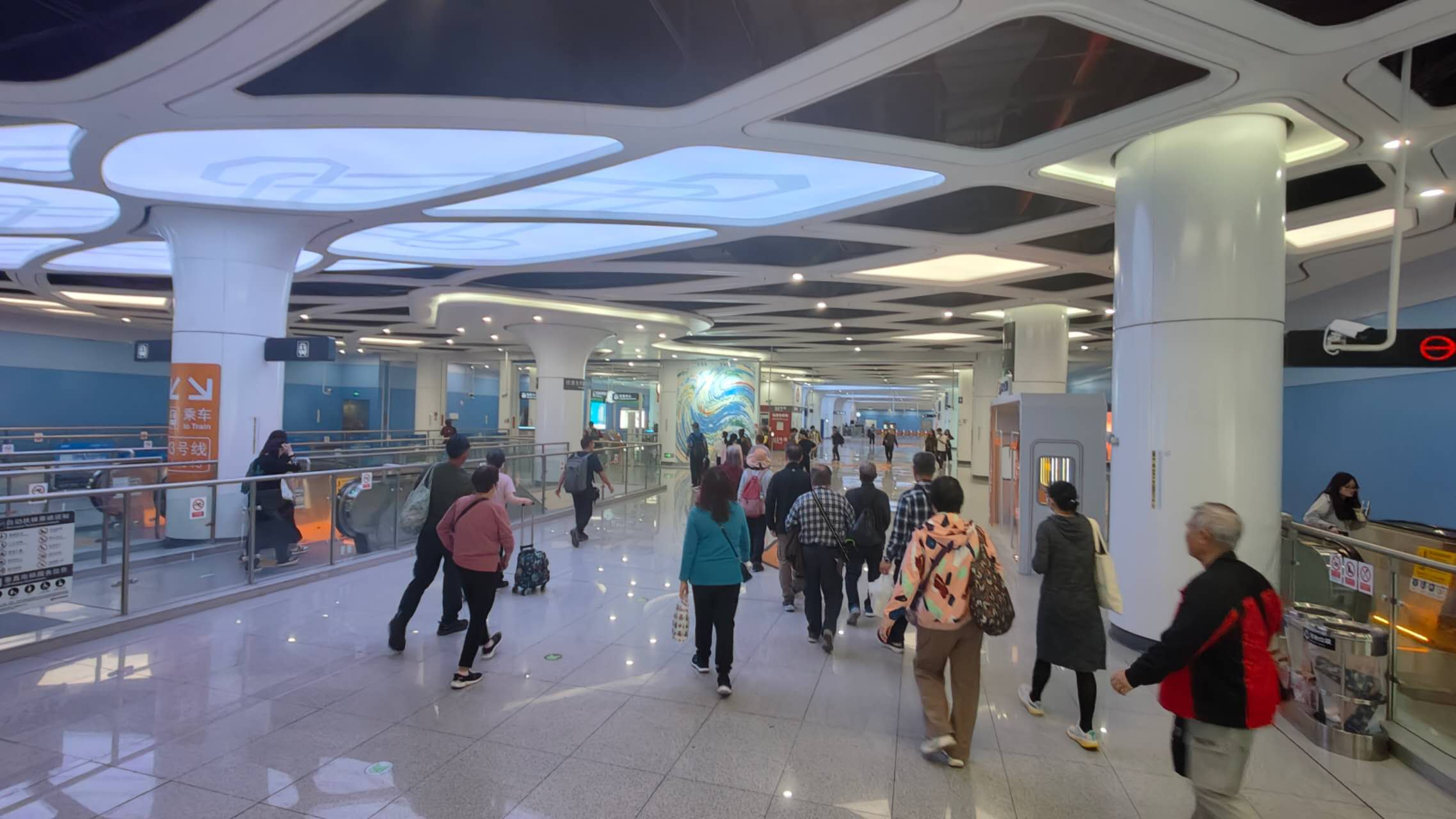
Concourse

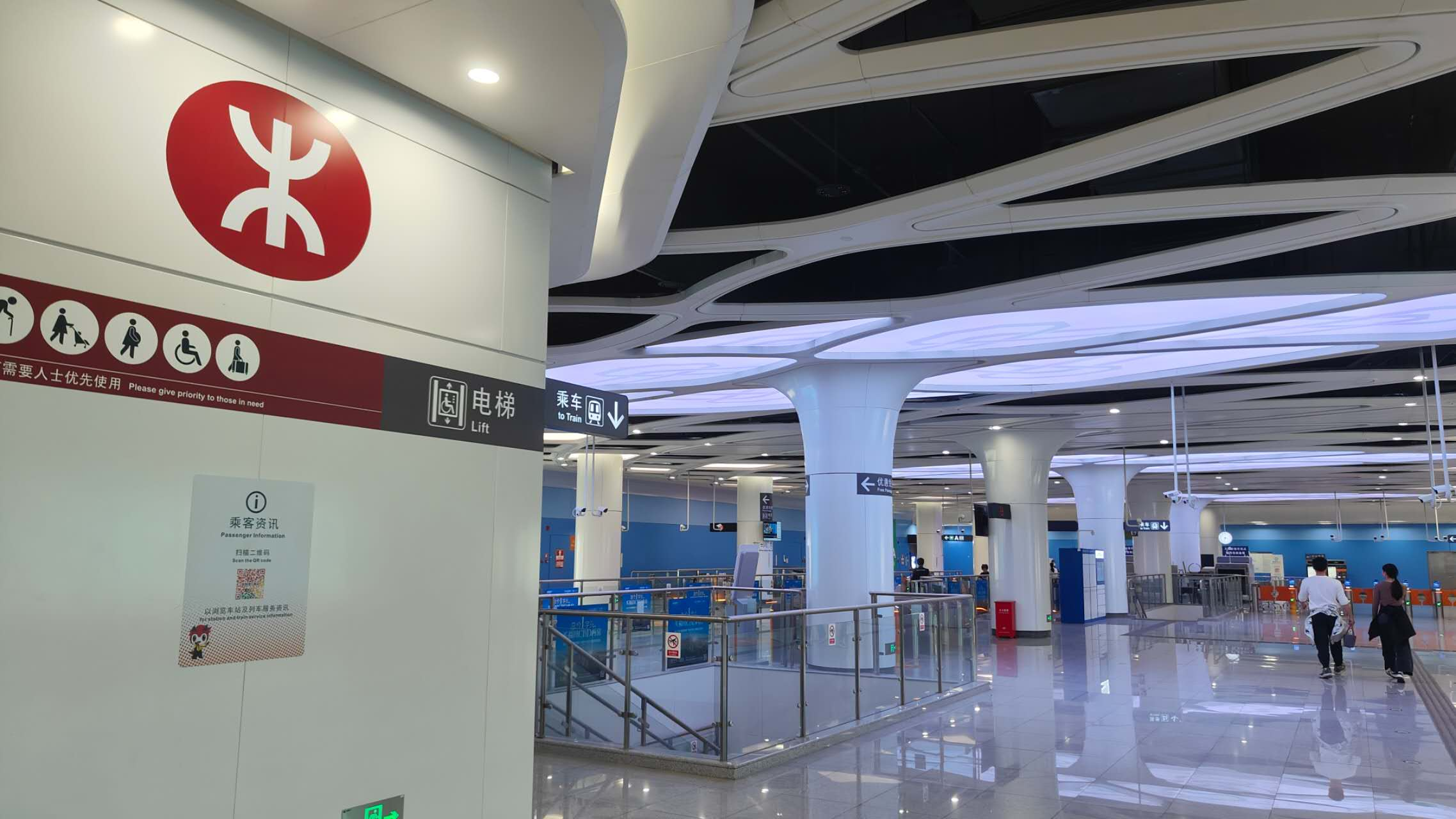
Concourse (With MTR Logo)

== Construction timeline ==
=== Phase 1 planning and construction ===
- On 26 July 2017, Shenzhen Metro Group Co., Ltd. issued the "Environmental Impact Report of Shenzhen Urban Rail Transit Line 13 Project", which includes this station, which is named Shenzhen Bay Checkpoint Station, because the station is close to the regional landmark Shenzhen Bay Port.
- On 10 January 2018, the first phase of Shenzhen Metro Line 13 officially started, of which the station was built by China Construction Fifth Bureau.
- On 28 March 2019, Shenzhen Bay Checkpoint Station completed the traffic relief work on Wanghai Road, providing site conditions for the next step of the main structure enclosure construction of the station.
- On 16 April 2019, the super-large diameter occlusal pile of the main enclosure structure of Shenzhen Bay Checkpoint Station began to be tested, which refreshed the record of the largest diameter of the occlusal pile construction of Shenzhen Metro, and also marked that the station officially entered the construction stage of the main enclosure structure.
- On 27 September 2020, the concrete pouring of the first floor slab of the open-cut section of the Shenzhen-Dengliang East section (Shenzhen Bay Checkpoint Station-Talent Park Station) was successfully completed, which opened the prelude to the comprehensive construction of the main structure of Shenzhen Bay Checkpoint Station.
- On 16 November 2020, the left line tunnel of the Shenzhen-Dengliang East section was successfully broken through, which is the third group of double-line sections of the whole line.
- On 30 December 2020, the main enclosure structure of Shenzhen Bay Checkpoint Station was successfully enclosed, which also marked the official entry of the station into the main structure construction stage.
- On 22 April 2022, the Shenzhen Municipal Bureau of Planning and Natural Resources issued the "Announcement on the Approval of the Plan for the Names of Related Lines of Shenzhen Rail Phase IV", in which the station will continue to use the project name Shenzhen Bay Checkpoint Station.

=== Phase 2 south planning and construction ===
On 29 December 2020, the construction of the second phase of the southern extension of Shenzhen Metro Line 13 officially started, and the line begins from the east end of the station.

== Future development ==
The line will extend south-west to Dongjiaotou Station to meet up with Line 2 for a third time, and this station will no longer be the terminus of the line after its opening. The southern extension of the second phase of the line is currently under construction and is expected to be opened in 2027.
