= Index of Shenzhen-related articles =

The following is an incomplete list of articles related to the city of Shenzhen, China, sorted in alphabetical order:

== 0–9 ==
- 17th Golden Eagle Awards
- 2008 Shenzhen anti-police riot
- 2011 Summer Universiade
- 2015 Shenzhen landslide

== B ==
- Bao'an County
- Bao'an District
- Buji Town
- Baishizhou
- Bao'an Stadium
- Beihuan Boulevard
- Binhai Boulevard

== C ==
- China Merchants Bank Tower
- ChiNext
- Coastal City
- Chang Fu Jin Mao Tower
- China Chuneng Tower
- Civic Center (Shenzhen)
- Coastal City
- Chiwan
- Chung Ying Street
- China Resources Headquarters
- Christ the King Church, Shenzhen

== D ==
- Danzhutou
- Dasha River (Guangdong)
- Dapeng Peninsula
- Dongmen Subdistrict, Shenzhen
- Dameisha Beach
- Dapeng New District
- Dongjiaotou
- Dongbin Road

== E ==
- East Pacific Center
- East Lake Park

== F ==
- Fairy Lake Botanical Garden
- Fuyong Ferry Terminal
- Futian District
- Futian Port
- Futian station
- Fenghuang Village

== G ==
- Guangming District
- Guomao Building
- Guangmingcheng Railway Station
- Guanlan River

== H ==
- Happy Valley Shenzhen
- Hanking Center
- He Xiangning Art Museum
- Heung Kong Tower
- Honghu Park
- Hon Kwok City Center
- Huangbei Subdistrict
- Huangbeiling
- Huanggang Port
- Huaqiangbei
- Huawei
- Huanggang Port

== I ==
- ITF Women's Circuit – Shenzhen

== J ==
- Jasic Incident
- Jiangsu Tower
- Jihe Expressway

== K ==
- KK100

== L ==
- Lianhuashan Park
- List of administrative divisions of Shenzhen
- List of parks in Shenzhen
- List of lakes and reservoirs in Shenzhen
- List of tallest buildings in Shenzhen
- Longgang District, Shenzhen
- Longhua District, Shenzhen
- Lianhuashan Park
- Liantang Subdistrict
- Luohu District
- Luohu Port

== M ==
- Minsk World
- Mirs Bay
- Meilin Reservoir

== N ==
- Nansha Ferry Port
- Nanshan District, Shenzhen
- Nan'ao Subdistrict
- Nantou Subdistrict
- National Supercomputing Center (Shenzhen)
- Nei Lingding Island
- Nanshan (mountain)
- New World Center (Shenzhen)
- Nanhai Boulevard
- NEO Tower

== O ==
- Overseas Chinese Town
- OCT Bay
- OCT East
- One Shenzhen Bay

== P ==
- Panglin Plaza
- ParaEngine
- Pingshan District
- Pinghu Railway Station
- Ping An Finance Center
- Peking University Shenzhen Graduate School
- Port of Shenzhen
- People's Park (Shenzhen)

== Q ==
- Qianhai
- Qiniangshan

== S ==
- Shenzhen
- Sha Tau Kok River
- Sham Chun River
- SEG Plaza
- Shekou Industrial Zone
- Shennan Road
- Shenzhen Bay Park
- Shenzhen Bay Port
- Shenzhen International Garden and Flower Expo Park
- Shenzhen Special Economic Zone
- Shenzhen–Hong Kong cross-boundary students
- Soviet aircraft carrier Minsk
- Shenzhen American International School
- Shenzhen Broadcasting Center Building
- Shenzhen Reservoir
- Shenzhen Convention and Exhibition Center
- Shenzhen Safari Park
- Shenzhen Special Zone Press Tower
- Shenzhen Stadium
- Shenzhen Stock Exchange
- Shenzhen Universiade Sports Centre
- Shun Hing Square
- South University of Science and Technology of China
- Shenzhen University
- Shenzhen Polytechnic
- Shenzhen Radio and TV University
- Shenzhen Institute of Information Technology
- Shenzhen Graduate School of Harbin Institute of Technology
- Shenzhen Bao'an International Airport
- Shenzhen railway station
- Shenzhen North station
- Shenzhen East railway station
- Shenzhen West railway station
- Shenzhen Pingshan railway station
- Shenzhen Special Zone Press Tower
- Shenzhen Broadcasting Center Building
- Shenzhen Museum
- Shenzhen F.C.
- Shenzhen Tram
- Splendid China Folk Village
- Shenzhen Safari Park
- Shum Yip Upperhills Tower 1
- Shekou Passenger Terminal
- Shekou

== T ==
- Taizishan Agricultural Trade Market
- Transport in Shenzhen
- TurboJET
- The Chinese University of Hong Kong, Shenzhen
- Time is Money, Efficiency is Life

== W ==
- Wutongshan Park
- Wanghai Road

== X ==
- Xichong, Shenzhen
- Xin'an Subdistrict, Shenzhen
- Xinghua Road, Shenzhen
- Xili Reservoir

== Y ==
- Yangmeikeng
- Yantian District
- Yitian Holiday Plaza

== Z ==
- Zhongshan Park (Shenzhen)
- Zhengshun Plaza
