= Tanglang Mountain =

Mountain in Shenzhen, Guangdong, China

Coordinates: 22°34′34″N 113°58′52″E

- mountain trail

Highest point
- Elevation: 430 m (1,410 ft)

Naming
- Native name: 塘朗山

Geography
- Location: Nanshan District, Shenzhen, Guangdong, China

Tanglang Mountain (Chinese: 塘朗山; pinyin: Tánglǎng Shān) is a mountain in the northern part of Nanshan District, Shenzhen, Guangdong, China. Its principal summit, Tanglang Peak, reaches an elevation of about 430 m (1,411 ft), making it the second-highest mountain in Nanshan District after Yangtai Mountain. The ridge runs broadly from east to west and forms part of the hilly terrain separating Nanshan District to the south from Bao'an and Longhua districts to the north.

Much of the mountain lies within Tanglang Mountain Country Park (塘朗山郊野公园), a forest-dominated urban country park covering approximately 991.13 ha (3.83 sq mi). Tanglang Mountain is used extensively for hiking. Its summit and ridges provide views across the Nanshan district and Shenzhen Bay.

== Geography ==
Tanglang Mountain is situated in the northern hill-and-basin zone of Nanshan District, an area traditionally associated with the Xili uplands. The mountain has an east–west orientation and slopes generally ranging from 25 to 34 degrees. Nanshan District is characterized by terrain that descends from the higher northern hills toward lower terraces and coastal plains around Shenzhen Bay.

The Tanglang Mountain landscape consists mainly of granite and forms a low mountainous chain including Wangtianluo, Tanglang Peak and Honghualing. The area has a southern subtropical monsoon climate and supports a mixture of secondary forest, shrubland and planted woodland. Five small mountain streams descend through its valleys and ultimately drain into the Dasha River, which flows south toward Shenzhen Bay.

== Ecology ==
Tanglang Mountain has relatively extensive forest habitat despite its location within Shenzhen's built-up metropolitan area. Surveys and reporting on the mountain have recorded more than 600 species of wild vascular plants. The vegetation includes secondary woodland, shrubs and artificial forest, together with populations of protected and uncommon plants. Tanglang Mountain is particularly associated with the rare Fairy Lake cycad (仙湖苏铁), whose wild population in Shenzhen occurs in the mountain area.

The forests also provide habitat for a variety of mammals, birds, reptiles and insects. Wildlife recorded in the area includes macaques, leopard cats, wild boar and pythons, as well as birds of prey and numerous butterfly and dragonfly species. A 2024 report on the mountain's natural resources described the 991.13-hectare country park as an important habitat for protected mammals including macaques and leopard cats, as well as an important locality for rare and endangered gymnosperms in Shenzhen.

The presence of wild macaques has also created management challenges where animal habitat overlaps with heavily used hiking routes. Visitors have been advised to avoid approaching or feeding the animals, and wildlife protection has become one of the issues addressed in the area's conservation policy.

Jimu Pavilion

== Recreation ==
Tanglang Mountain is one of the principal hiking areas close to Shenzhen's central urban districts. Trails and mountain roads connect entrances on the southern and western sides of the country park with viewpoints and the summit. Jimu Pavilion, situated at the high point of the mountain, provides panoramic views over Shenzhen Bay, the urban districts of Shenzhen and, in suitable weather, northern Hong Kong.
