= List of lakes and reservoirs in Shenzhen =

The following is a list of lakes and reservoirs in Shenzhen, China.

== Luohu District ==
Image	Title	Chinese title	Surface area (Total)	Storage capacity (m^{3})	Notes
	Shenzhen Reservoir	深圳水库	60.5 square kilometres (14,900 acres)	45,770,000 cubic metres (12.09×10^{9} US gal)	
	Yinhu Reservoir	银湖水库			
	Henglikou Reservoir	横沥口水库			
	Dakeng Reservoir	大坑水库			
	Xiaokeng Reservoir	小坑水库			
	Jinhu Reservoir	金湖水库			
	Fairy Lake	仙湖			

== Futian District ==
Image	Title	Chinese title	Surface area (Total)	Storage capacity (m^{3})	Notes
	Meilin Reservoir	梅林水库	4.26 square kilometres (1,050 acres)	1,309 cubic metres (0.000346×10^{9} US gal)	
	Xiangmi Lake	香蜜湖			
	Liantangwei Reservoir	莲塘尾水库			
	Heliankeng Reservoir	禾镰坑水库			

== Nanshan District ==
Image	Title	Chinese title	Surface area (Total)	Storage capacity (m^{3})	Notes
	Xili Reservoir	西丽水库 or 西沥水库	29 km^{2} (11 sq mi)	3,238.81 m^{3} (7.7703×10^{−7} cu mi)	
	Changlingpi Reservoir	长岭皮水库			
	Qianjing Reservoir	钳颈水库			
	Niuqikeng Reservoir	牛蜞坑水库			

== Yantian District ==
Image	Title	Chinese title	Surface area (Total)	Storage capacity (m^{3})	Notes
	Yantian Reservoir	盐田水库			
	Dashuikeng Reservoir	大水坑水库			
	Wangji Lake	望箕湖			
	Luomaling Reservoir	骆马岭水库			
	Zhengkeng Reservoir	证坑水库			
	Sanzhoutang Reservoir	三洲塘水库			
	Honghuali Reservoir	红花沥水库			
	Enshang Reservoir	恩上水库			
	Yuejin Reservoir	跃进水库			
	Shangping Reservoir	上坪水库			
	Diecui Lake	叠翠湖			

== Bao'an District ==
Image	Title	Chinese title	Surface area (Total)	Storage capacity (m^{3})	Notes
	Tiegang Reservoir	铁岗水库			
	Jiulongkeng Reservoir	九龙坑水库			
	Danshuihe Reservoir	担水河水库			
	Luotian Reservoir	罗田水库			
	Wuzhipa Reservoir	五指耙水库			
	Laohukeng Reservoir	老虎坑水库			
	Shiyan Reservoir	石岩水库			
	Shipotou Reservoir	石坡头水库			
	Niugutou Reservoir	牛牯头水库			
	Shigougong Reservoir	石狗公水库			
	Hecuojian Reservoir	禾搓涧水库			
	Baigepo Reservoir	白鸽坡水库			
	Jingkou Reservoir	径口水库			
	Biyan Reservoir	碧眼水库			
	Pankeng Reservoir	畔坑水库			
	Wangtian Lake	望天湖			
	Luozaikeng Reservoir	罗仔坑水库			
	Henggang Reservoir	横岗水库			
	Guikeng Reservoir	桂坑水库			
	Tiekeng Reservoir	铁坑水库			
	Liantang Reservoir	莲塘水库			
	Dadang Reservoir	大凼水库			
	Hong'ao Reservoir	红坳水库			
	Jiangangkeng Reservoir	尖岗坑水库			
	Hengkeng Reservoir	横坑水库			
	Houdikeng Reservoir	后底坑水库			
	Apoji Reservoir	阿婆髻水库			
	Shitou Lake (Stone Lake)	石头胡			
	Shuichetou Reservoir	水车头水库			
	Luocun Reservoir	罗村水库			
	Changliupo Reservoir	长流坡水库			
	Qili Reservoir	七沥水库			
	Wushan Reservoir	屋山水库			
	Lixin Reservoir	立新水库			
	Qiankeng Reservoir	茜坑水库			
	Zhangkengjing Reservoir	樟坑径水库			
	Changkeng Reservoir	长坑水库			
	Dashuikeng Reservoir	大水坑水库			
	Xianwu Reservoir	冼屋水库			
	Shimajing Reservoir	石马径水库			
	San'ao Reservoir	三坳水库			
	Jiugongkeng Reservoir	九公坑水库			
	Minzhi Reservoir	民治水库			
	Niuzui Reservoir	牛咀水库			
	Hongmushan Reservoir	红木山水库			
	Gaofeng Reservoir	高峰水库			
	Lengshuikeng Reservoir	冷水坑水库			
	Shi'ao Reservoir	石凹水库			
	Laiwushan Reservoir	赖屋山水库			
	Dakeng Reservoir	大坑水库			
	Minle Reservoir	民乐水库			

== Longgang District ==
Image	Title	Chinese title	Surface area (Total)	Storage capacity (m^{3})	Notes
	Nankeng Reservoir	南坑水库			
	Jinyuan Reservoir	金园水库			
	Nanshan Reservoir	南山水库			
	Sanlian Reservoir	三联水库			
	Rengonghu Reservoir	人工湖水库			
	Huangniu Lake (Yellow Cattle Lake)	黄牛湖			
	Jigongkeng Reservoir	鸡公坑水库			
	Yabao Reservoir	雅宝水库			
	Tuokeng Reservoir	托坑水库			
	Miaokeng Reservoir	苗坑水库			
	Gankeng Reservoir	甘坑水库			
	Zhuluopi Reservoir	猪猡皮水库			
	Longkou Reservoir	龙口水库			
	Tongluojing Reservoir	铜锣径水库			
	Tangkengbei Reservoir	塘坑背水库			
	Huangzhukeng Reservoir	黄竹坑水库			
	Niushiwo Reservoir	牛屎窝水库			
	Nanfeng'ao Reservoir	南风坳水库			
	Shenxianling Reservoir	神仙岭水库			
	Xiao'ao Reservoir	小坳水库			
	Shilongdu Reservoir	石龙肚水库			
	Xifeng'ao Reservoir	西风坳水库			
	Laohuli Reservoir	老虎沥水库			
	Qinglinjing Reservoir	清林径水库			
	Shiliao Reservoir	石寮水库			

== See also ==
- List of parks in Shenzhen
