= Yu Pengnian =

Chinese businessman

- Born: November 21, 1922
- Died: May 2, 2015 (aged 92); Futian District, Shenzhen, China
- Occupations: Real estate; philanthropist

Yu Pengnian (Chinese: 余彭年) (1922–2015) was a Chinese real estate magnate and philanthropist.

== Early life ==
On 21 November 1922, Yu was born in Hunan Province, China. Yu grew up poor.

== Career ==
In 1945, Yu worked as a rickshaw driver in Shanghai, China.

In the 1957, Yu started his working life in Hong Kong as a cleaner. In the 1960s, Yu was a construction worker. Yu followed his boss to Taiwan and started a property business.

In 1973, Yu invested in the stock market including junk stocks and lost everything.

In 1974, Yu bought the property, former home of Bruce Lee, in Kowloon Tong, Hong Kong. Yu converted it into a "love hotel" where the rental fee was hourly.

In 2000, Yu opened Shenzhen Panglin Hotel in the Lo Wu District of Hong Kong.

Yu made his money as a Shenzhen hotel and real estate entrepreneur.

== Philanthropy ==
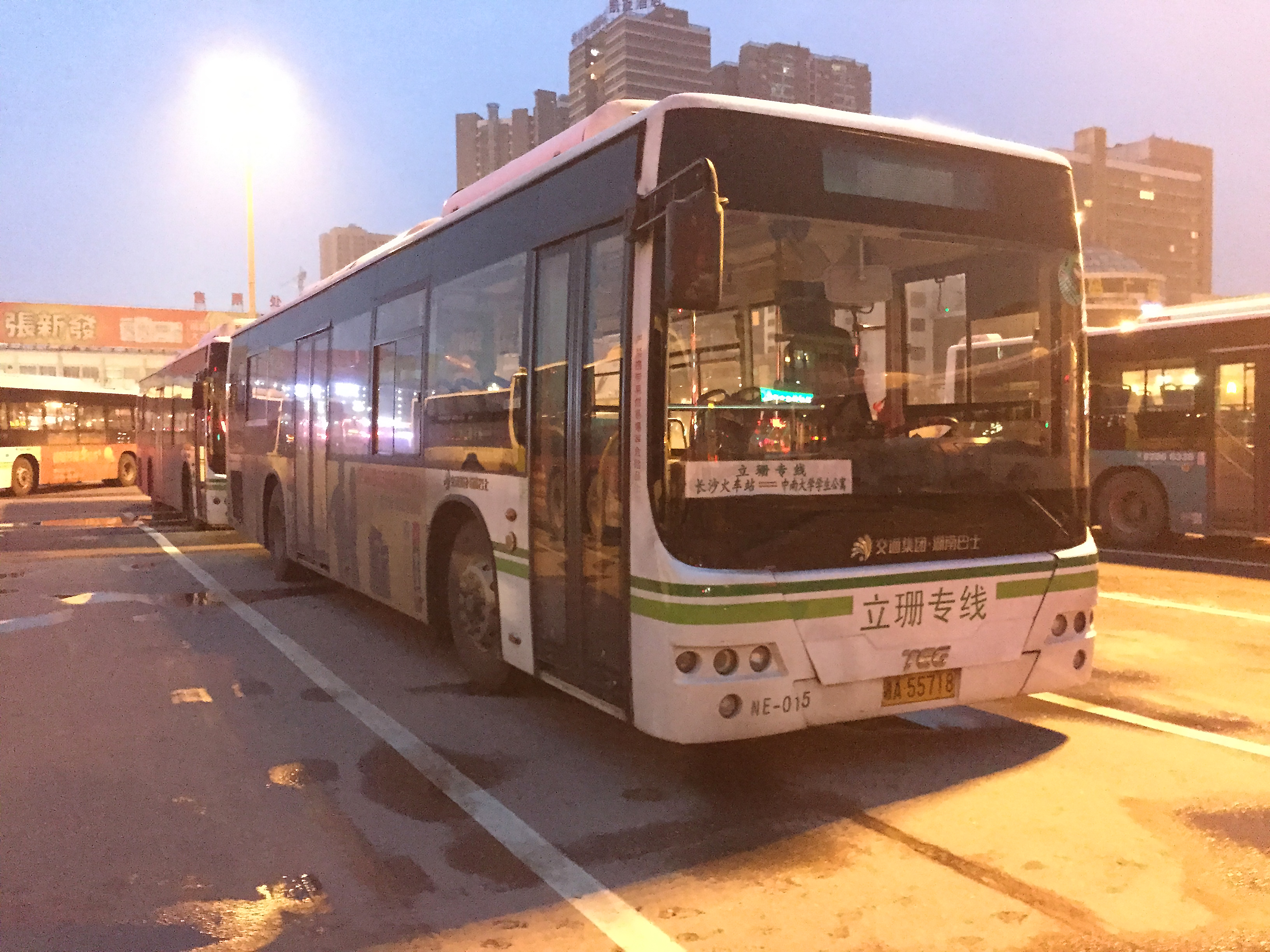
Changsha Bus Lishan Line was founded by Yu in 1988

Yu founded the Yu Pengnian Foundation, which donates money to several different causes, usually for health, education and disaster relief. He himself suffered with cataracts and his charity has funded over 150,000 cataract removal operations across China since 2003. It has also had a hand in setting up numerous Project Hope schools in the western rural areas of China.

In 2008, Yu gave away a property (valued $18 million HK in 2010) which became the Bruce Lee museum in Kowloon Tong neighborhood of Hong Kong.

In April 2010, at 88 years old, Yu announced that he donated his remaining fortune of $3.2 billion yuan to the Yu Pengnian Foundation. In all, his entire life fortune of $8.2 billion Chinese yuan ($1.2 billion HK) has been donated to the foundation. HSBC is designated as the trustee of the foundation.

== Personal life ==
In 1945, Yu moved to Shanghai, China. In 1953, Yu was arrested and sent to a labor camp for three years in Anhui, China. In 1957, Yu was approved to leave China and moved to Hong Kong, but he was unable to communicate in Cantonese nor English.

Yu had suffered with poor eyesight due to cataracts and was one of the richest people in Guangdong Province, China.

Yu was married and had two sons. Although Yu's surname is Yu, his son and grandson's surname is Pang. Yu's son is Pang Ah-fan.

In the 1980s, Yu moved to the Shenzhen area of China.

In May 2015, Yu died in Shenzhen, China. He was 92. Yu had instructed in his will that at the time of his death, his properties and assets will be donated to charitable trust fund.

Yu's grandsons are Pang San-hon and Pang Chi-ping, who is his trustee.

== See also ==
- Panglin Plaza
- Bruce Lee
- Kowloon Tong
