= Huangbei Subdistrict =

Huangbei Subdistrict 黄贝街道
- Subdistrict

Chinese transcription(s)
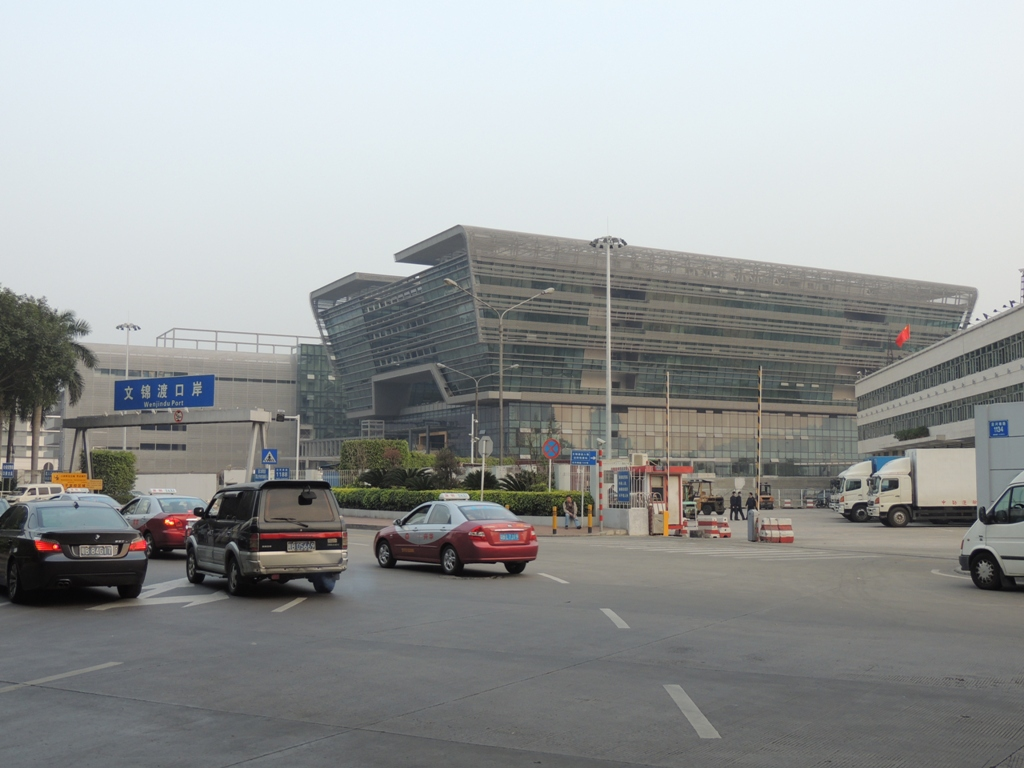
- Interactive map of Huangbei Subdistrict
- Coordinates: 22.5519°N 114.1491°E
- Country: China
- Province: Guangdong
- City: Shenzhen
- District: Luohu

Area
  - Total: 7.5 km^{2} (2.9 sq mi)

Population (2007)
  - Total: 201,300
  - Density: 27,000/km^{2} (70,000/sq mi)
- Time zone: UTC+8 (China Standard Time)

Huangbei Subdistrict (pinyin: Huángbèi Jiēdào) is a subdistrict of the Luohu, Shenzhen, Guangdong, China.

== See also ==
- List of township-level divisions of Guangdong
- Huangbeiling, a former village in the subdistrict
