= Xiangmi Lake =

Lake in Shenzhen, China

- Xiangmaochang Reservoir (香茅场水库)
- 香蜜湖 (Chinese)
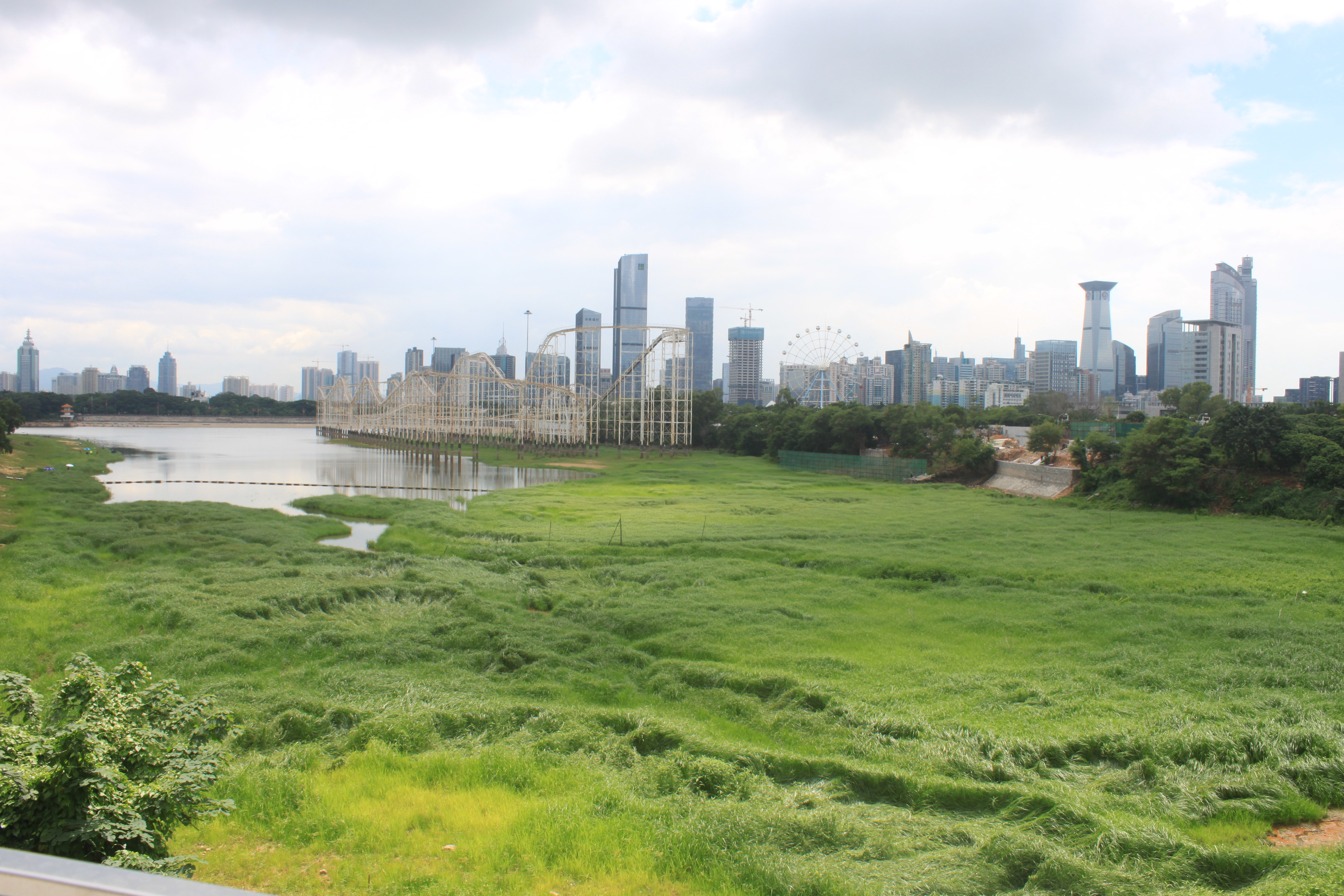
- The Xiangmi Lake during the dry season in October 2016.

- Location within Guangdong
- Location: Futian District, Shenzhen, Guangdong, China
- Coordinates: 22°33′13″N 114°02′19″E
- Type: Lake
- Basin countries: China
- Built: 1966
- Surface area: 1.94 square kilometres (480 acres)
- Water volume: 1,783,500 m^{3} (0.0004279 cu mi)

Xiangmi Lake (Chinese: 香蜜湖; pinyin: Xiāngmìhú) is a man-made recreational lake located in Futian District, Shenzhen, Guangdong, China. It covers a total surface area of 1.94 km^{2} (0.75 sq mi) and has a storage capacity of some 1,783,500 m^{3} (0.0004279 cu mi) of water. The lake provides landscape water and is used for flood and silt control, and recreational activities, such as boating, swimming, and fishing.

== History ==
Xiangmi Lake was established and opened to the public in 1966, which has fun, food and drink, and tourism. At that time it bore the name Xiangmaochang Reservoir (香茅场水库), which was extended to a small reservoir in 1978.

== Transportation ==
- Take bus No. 44, 46, 65, 107, 108, 235 or 237 to Xiangmi Lake North Bus Stop (香蜜湖北站)
- Take subway Line 1 (Luobao Line) to get off at Xiangmi Station.

== See also ==
- List of lakes and reservoirs in Shenzhen
