= Jiangsu Tower =

Skyscraper in Shenzhen, Guangdong, China

Coordinates: 22.546088°N 114.055606°E

- (simplified Chinese: 江苏大厦; traditional Chinese: 江蘇大廈)
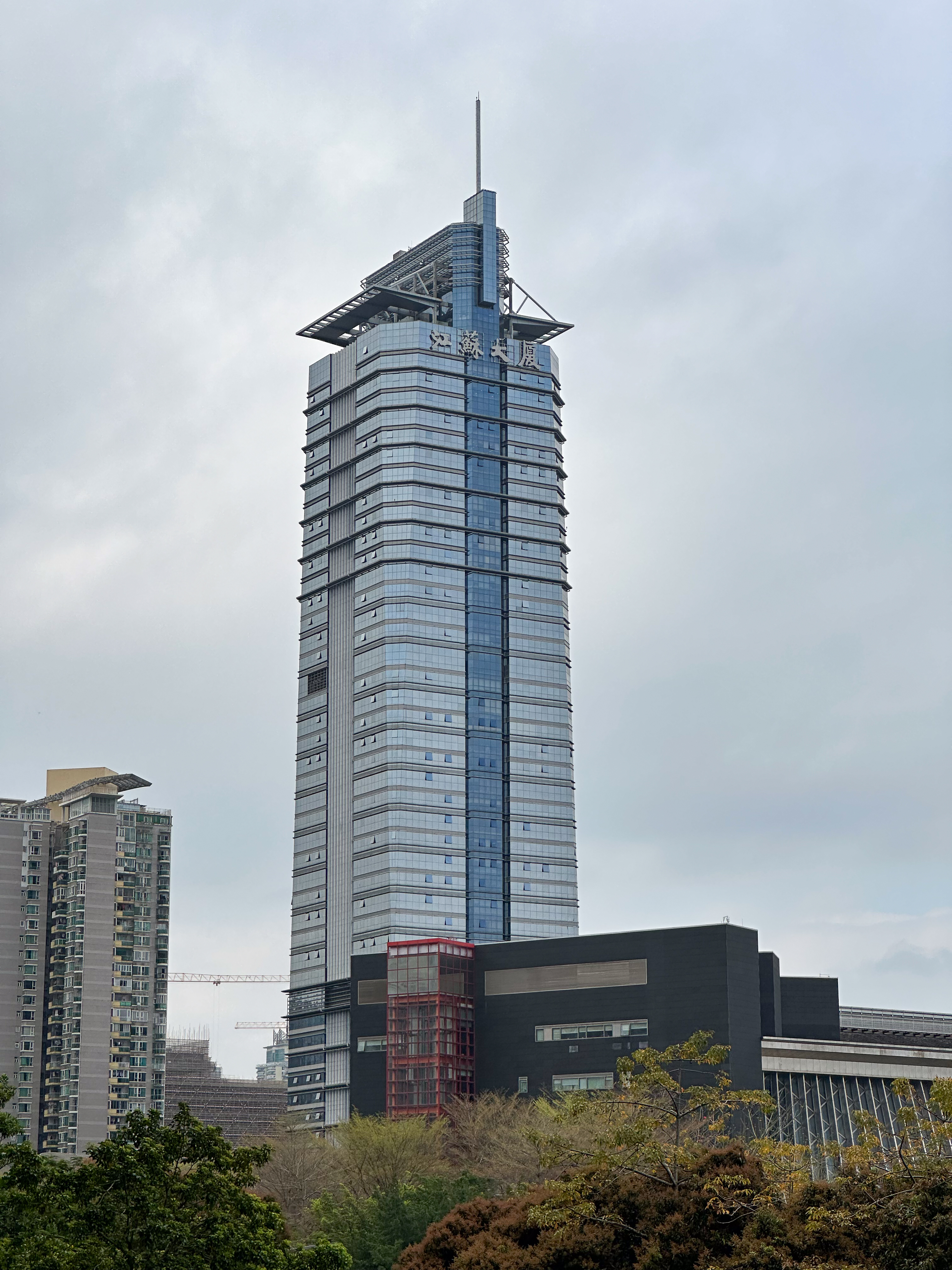

General information
- Status: Completed
- Type: Office
- Location: Shenzhen, Guangdong, China
- Completed: 2001

Height
- Tip: 208 m (682 ft)

Technical details
- Floor count: 51

Jiangsu Tower is a 208-meter-high office skyscraper in the City of Shenzhen, Guangdong, the People's Republic of China. The Tower was opened in 2001, near Shenzhen Children Hospital, Lianhuashan Park and Shenzhen Municipal People's Government at Civic Centre.
