= Xili Reservoir =

- 西沥水库 (Chinese)
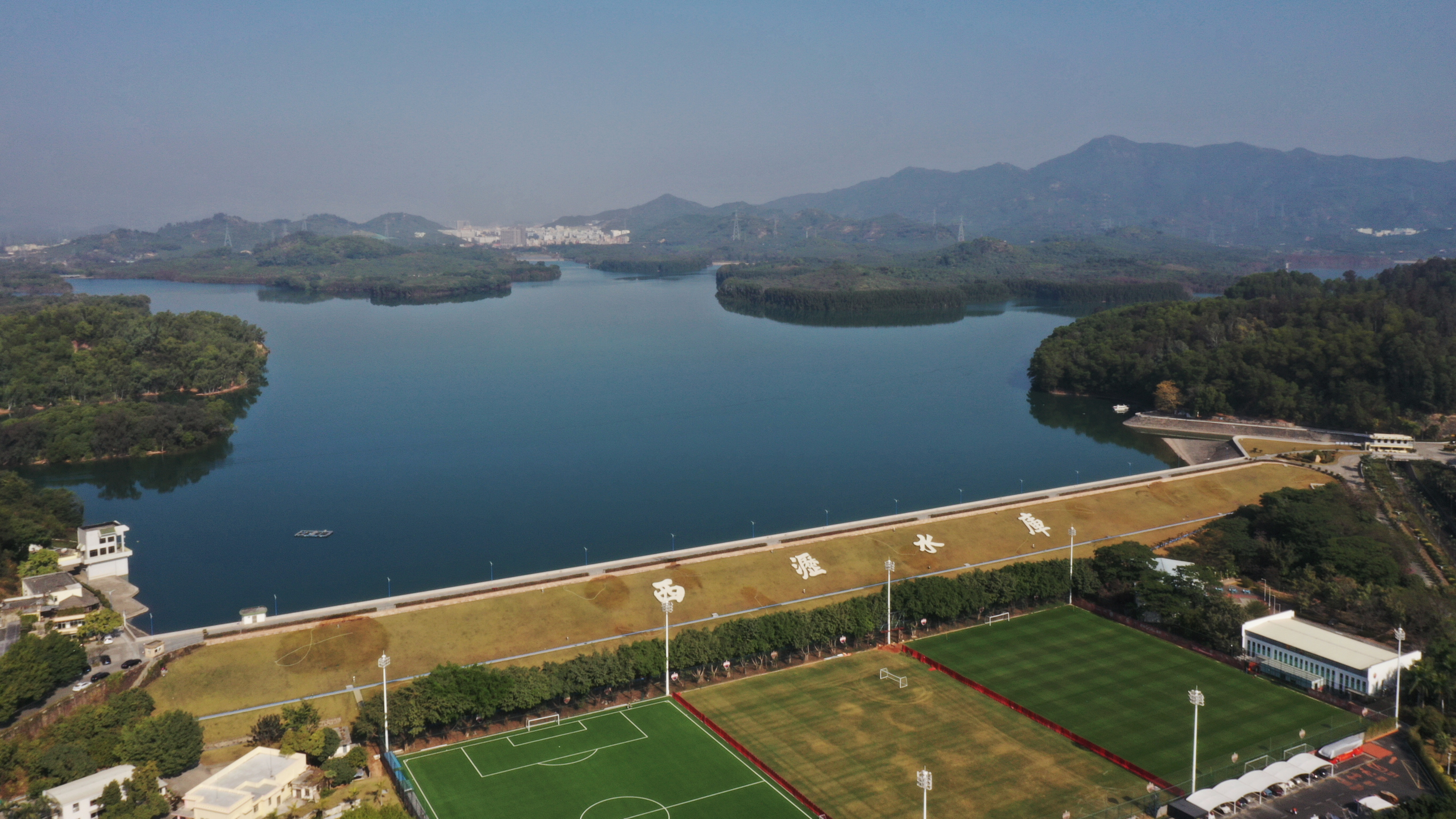
- Xili Reservoir in 2021

- Location within Guangdong
- Location: Xili Subdistrict, Nanshan District, Shenzhen, Guangdong
- Coordinates: 22°36′37″N 113°58′14″E
- Type: Reservoir
- Primary outflows: Dasha River
- Basin countries: China
- Built: March 1960
- First flooded: 1960
- Surface area: 29 square kilometres (7,200 acres)
- Max. depth: 21.67 m (71.1 ft)
- Water volume: 3,238.81 cubic metres (0.00085560×10^{9} US gal)

Xili Reservoir (simplified Chinese: 西沥水库; traditional Chinese: 西瀝水庫; pinyin: Xīlì Shuǐkù) is a reservoir located in Xili Subdistrict, Nanshan District, in the southwest of Shenzhen.

== History ==
Construction began in December 1959 and completed in March 1960. Its drainage basin is about 29 km^{2} (11 sq mi), and it can hold up to 3,238.81 m^{3} (7.7703×10^{−7} cu mi) of water at full capacity. It belongs to the first grade water source protection area (一级水源保护区) and is part of Shenzhen's water supply network. The reservoir provides drinking water and water for irrigation. The reservoir discharges into Dasha River which empties into the South China Sea in Shenzhen Bay.

== Public Access ==
It is not open to the public.

== Transportation ==
- Take bus No. 36 or 226 to Xili Zoo Bus Stop (西丽动物园总站)

== See also ==
- List of lakes and reservoirs in Shenzhen
