= Taizishan Agricultural Trade Market =

Taizishan Agricultural Trade Market (Chinese:太子山农贸市场) was a largely unorganized wholesale market near the junction of Qianhai Road and Dongbin Road, Nanshan, Shenzhen. It opened in 1999 and consisted of over 300 vendors. It was also the largest market in the district. The market was demolished due to safety concerns in early May 2016.
