= Guanlan River =

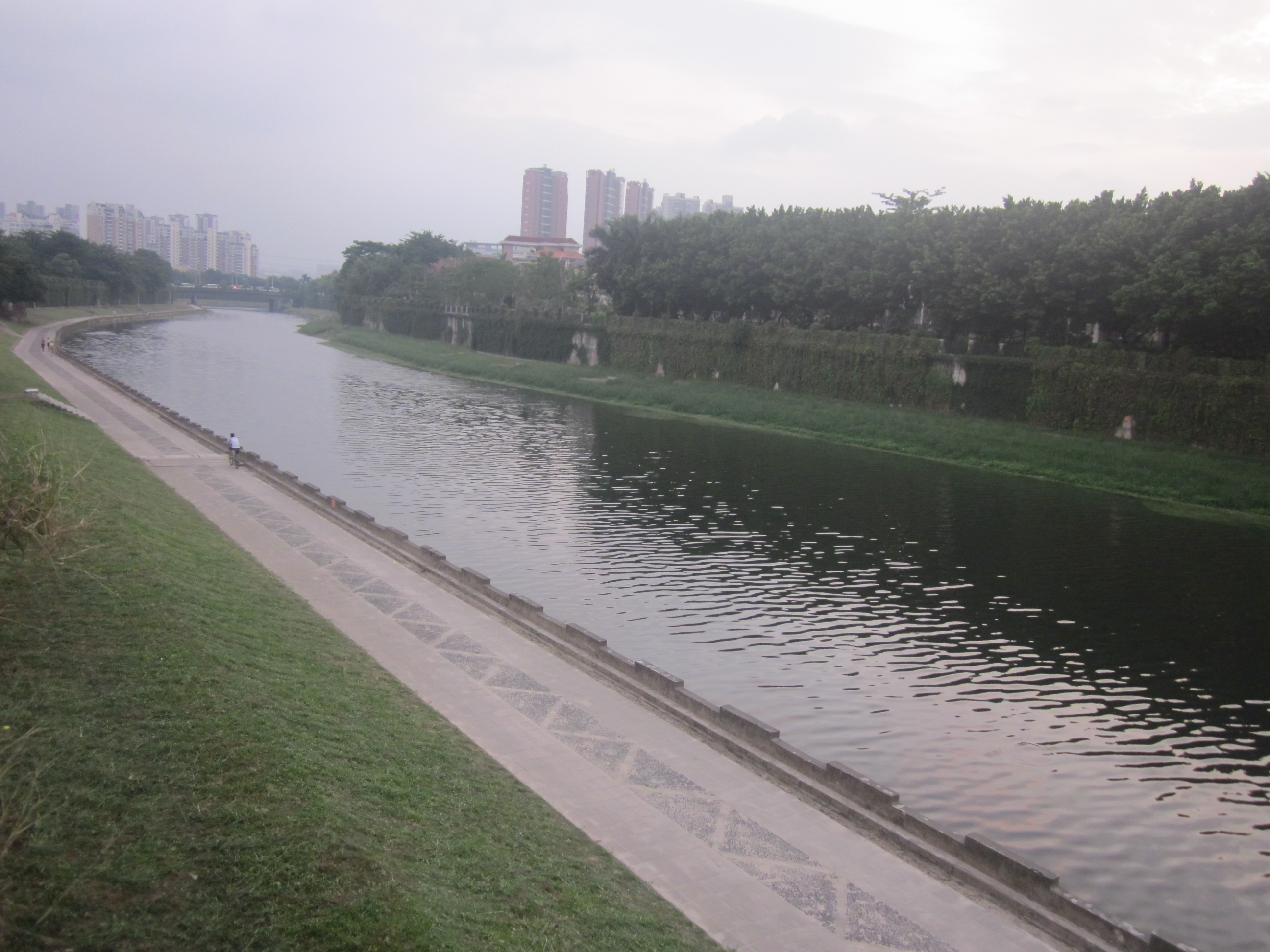
- Picture of Guanlan River in Longhua New District, Shenzhen, Guangdong, China.
- Native name: 观澜河 (Chinese)

Location
- Country: China
- Province: Guangdong
- Cities: Shenzhen; Dongguan

Physical characteristics
- Source
  - location: Da'naoke Hill
  - coordinates: 22°47′47.1804″N 114°3′3.762″E
- Mouth
  - location: Qiaotou Town
  - coordinates: 23°1′48.1044″N 114°6′34.1892″E
- Length: 88 km (55 mi)

Guanlan River is a tributary of the Shima River (石马河) located in both cities of Dongguan and Shenzhen. It is 88 kilometres (55 mi) long and drains an area of 1,249 square kilometres (482 sq mi). Guanlan River rises in Da'naoke Hill (大脑壳山), north of Shenzhen, and flows generally north through Qinghu Village (清湖村) and Guanlan Subdistrict, to Dongguan, then flows north to join Shima River in Yantian Stream (雁田水), where it feeds into Dong River, about 1 square kilometre (0.39 mi^{2}) near Qiaotou Town (桥头镇).

== Tributaries ==
The river's has five major tributaries, the Dalang Stream (大浪河), Minzhi Stream (民治河), Zhangkengjing Stream (樟坑径河), Niuhu Stream (牛湖水), and Baihua Stream (白花河).

== Environmental concerns ==
Across the area, millions of tons of raw life sewage, industrial waste and fertilizer runoff disposal contribute to the severe pollution of the Guanlan River.

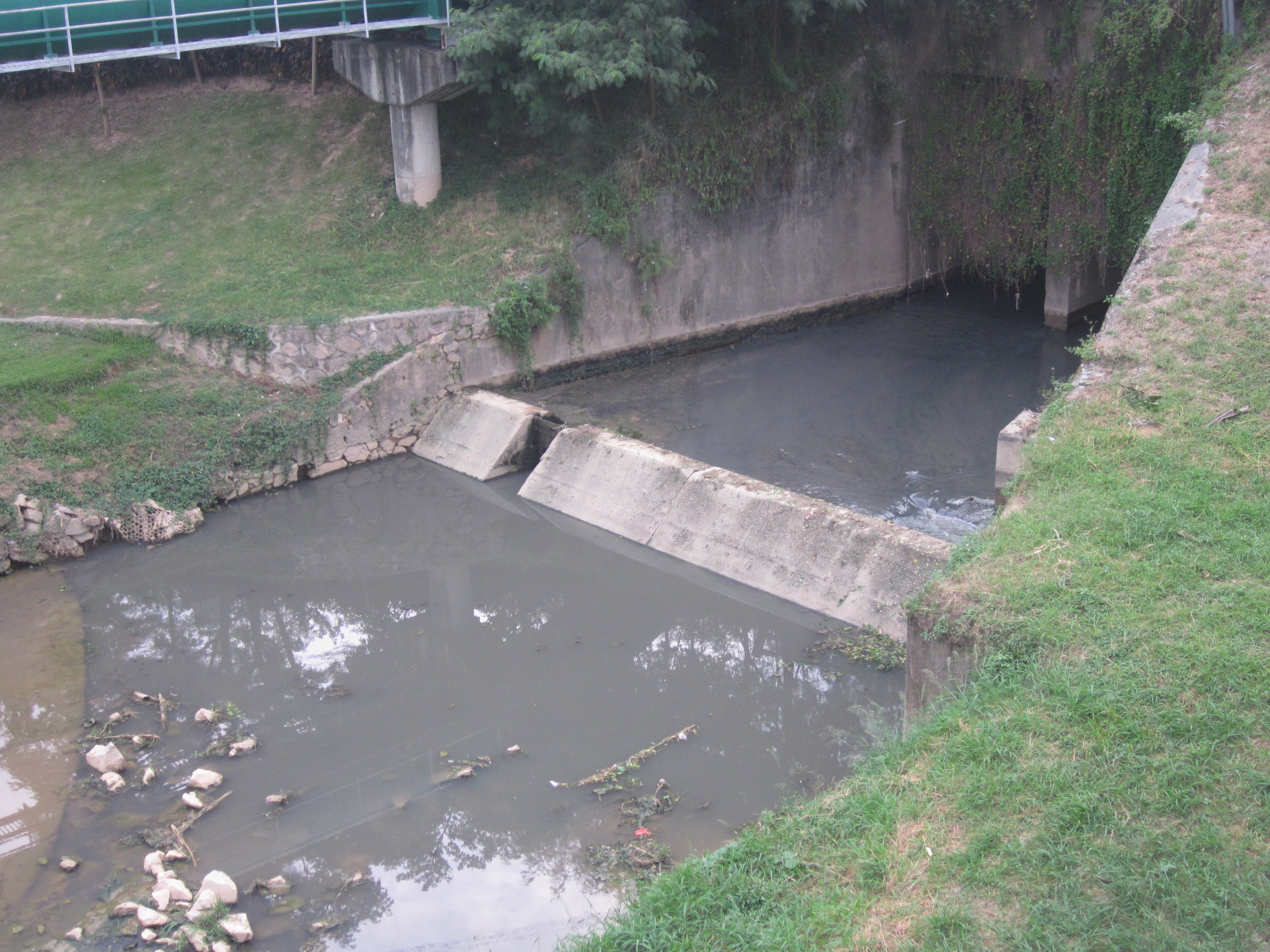
life sewage, industrial waste and fertilizer runoff are being discharged into the Guanlan River.
