= New World Center (Shenzhen) =

Skyscraper in Shenzhen, Guangdong, China

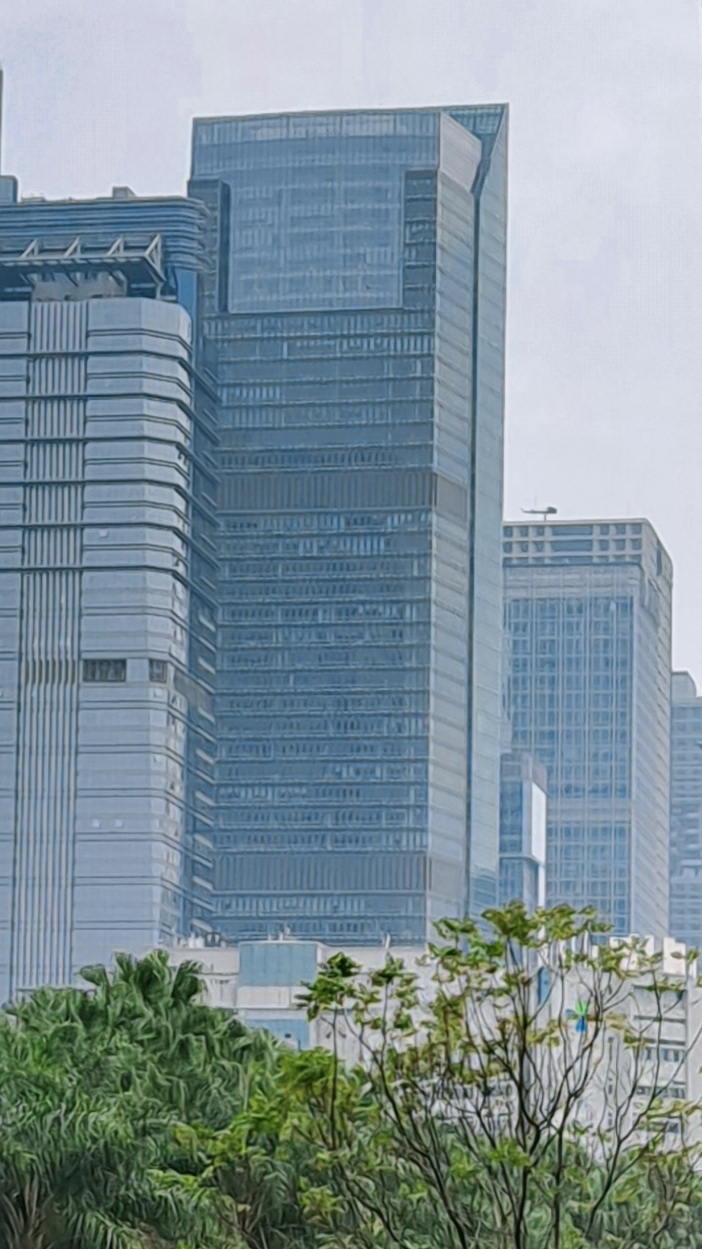

General information
- Status: Completed
- Type: Office
- Location: Shenzhen, China
- Coordinates: 22°32′53″N 114°03′01.4″E
- Completed: 2006

Height
- Antenna spire: 238 m (781 ft)

Technical details
- Floor count: 53
- Lifts/elevators: Made by Schindler Group

New World Center is a 53-floor 238 meter (781 foot) tall office skyscraper completed in 2006 located in Shenzhen, China.
