= Liantang Subdistrict =

Coordinates: 22.5670°N 114.1640°E

Liantang Subdistrict 莲塘街道
- Subdistrict
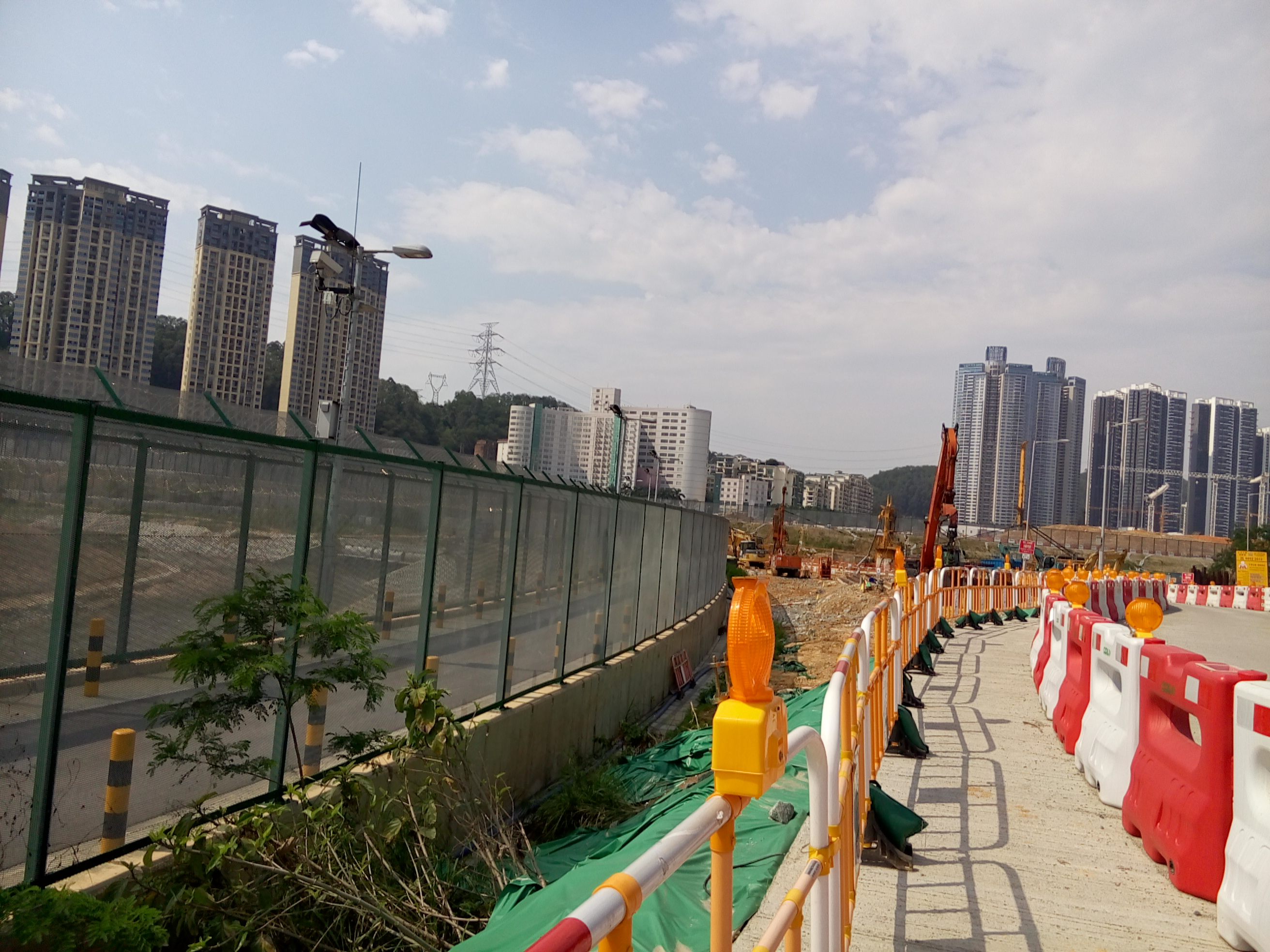
- Liantang as viewed from Ta Kwu Ling, Hong Kong across the border and Shenzhen River
- Interactive map of Liantang Subdistrict
- Country: China
- Province: Guangdong
- City: Shenzhen
- District: Luohu

Area
  - Total: 12.46 km^{2} (4.81 sq mi)

Population (2010)
  - Total: 123,000
  - Density: 9,870/km^{2} (25,600/sq mi)
- Time zone: UTC+8 (China Standard Time)

Liantang Subdistrict
- Traditional Chinese: 蓮塘街道
- Simplified Chinese: 莲塘街道
Transcriptions
Standard Mandarin
- Hanyu Pinyin: Lián táng jiē dào
Yue: Cantonese
- Jyutping: lin4 tong4 gaai1 dou6

Liantang Subdistrict (Chinese: 莲塘街道) is a subdistrict of Luohu District, Shenzhen, China. It is located south of Xianhu Botanical Garden and directly north of Ta Kwu Ling, Hong Kong across the Shenzhen River.
