= Shenzhen Broadcasting Center Building =

Skyscraper in Shenzhen, Guangdong, China

Coordinates: 22.5380°N 114.0500°E

Shenzhen Broadcasting Center
- 訊息樞紐中心
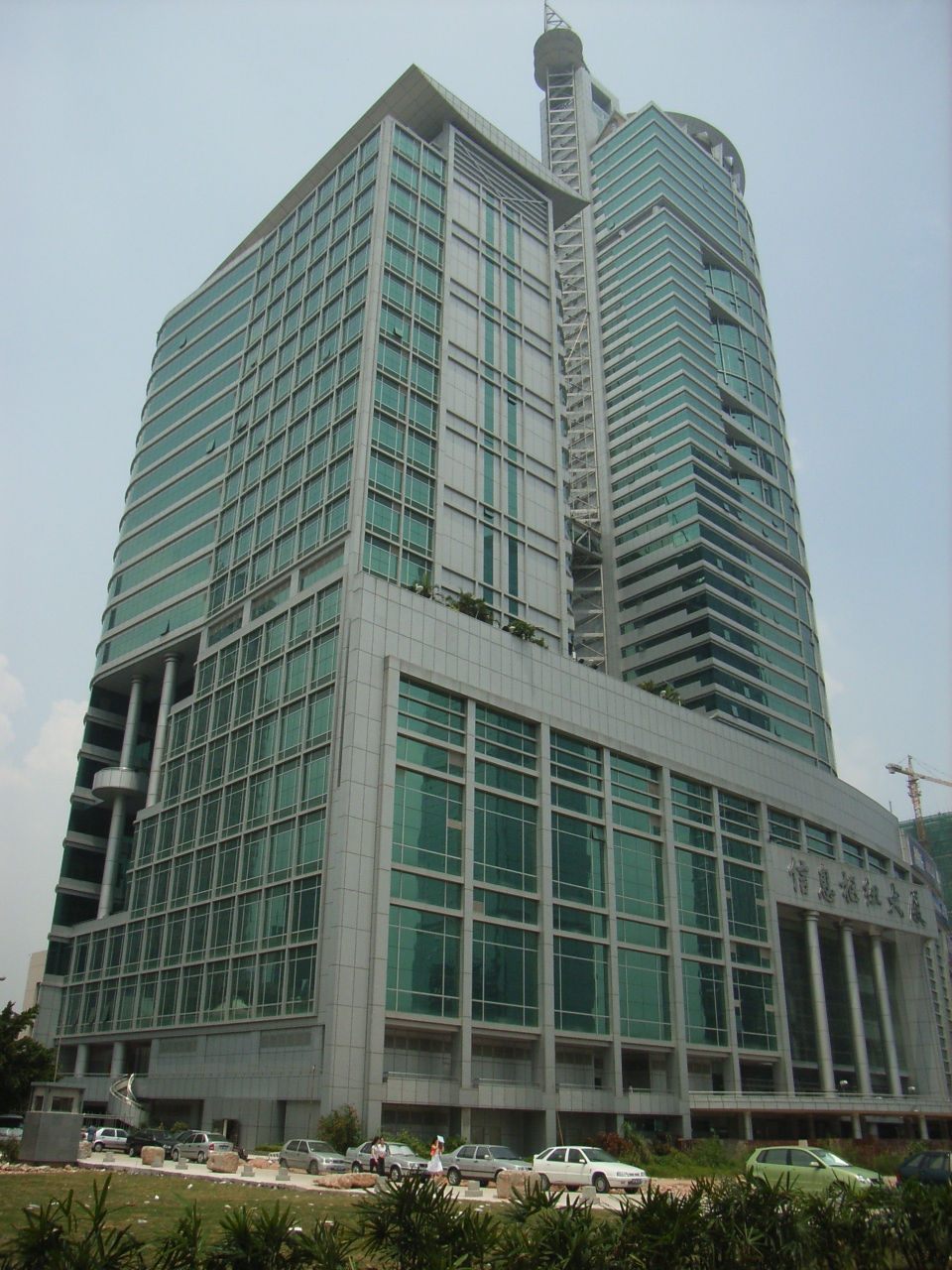

General information
- Status: Completed
- Type: office
- Location: 5055 Yitian Road, Futian District, Shenzhen, China
- Completed: 2001

Height
- Height: 240.7 metres (790 ft) (main tower)

Technical details
- Floor count: 48 (main tower)

The Shenzhen Broadcasting Center Building (Chinese: 深圳郵電信息樞紐中心大廈) is a 240 metres (790 ft) skyscraper in the city of Shenzhen, China. It has 48 floors and was completed in 2001.

== See also ==
- List of tallest buildings in Shenzhen
