= Shenzhen Special Zone Press Tower =

Skyscraper in Shenzhen, Guangdong, China

- 深圳特区报业大厦
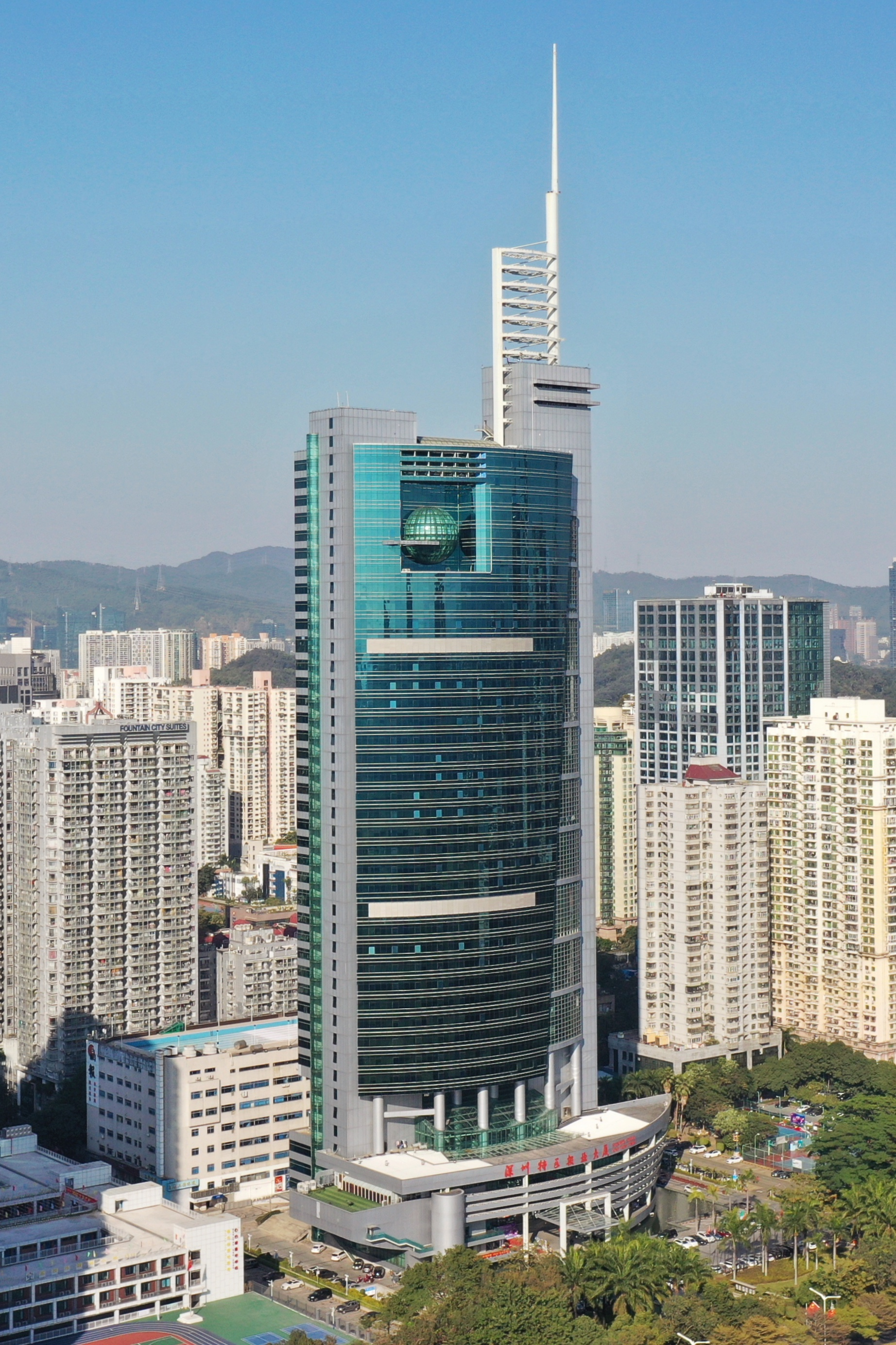
- The Shenzhen Special Zone Press Tower in December 2020
- Interactive map of the Shenzhen Special Zone Press Tower area
- Alternative names: Shenzhen Special Zone Daily Tower

General information
- Status: Completed
- Type: Office
- Location: 6008 Shennan Boulevard, Futian District, Shenzhen, Guangdong, China
- Coordinates: 22°32′37″N 114°02′25″E
- Completed: 1998

Height
- Architectural: 260 m (853 ft)
- Tip: 260 m (853 ft)
- Roof: 187 m (614 ft)
- Top floor: 167 m (548 ft)

Technical details
- Floor count: 47 (+3 below-grade)

Design and construction
- Architects: Gong Wei Min, Lu Yang, Shenzhen University
- Structural engineer: Fu Xue Yi, Shenzhen University
- Main contractor: China Construction Third Engineering Bureau Co., Ltd.; Shenzhen Company

Shenzhen Special Zone Press Tower (Chinese: 深圳特区报业大厦) is a 260 m (853 ft) tall office skyscraper located in the Futian borough of Shenzhen, China. The tower was completed in 1998 and has 47 floors above ground and 3 underground floors.

It is 187 metres to the roof and 167 metres to the main roof above the curved glass curtain.

== See also ==
- List of skyscrapers
