= ParaEngine =

ParaEngine Co.
- Company type: Private
- Industry: Internet, Computer software
- Founded: 2007.3
- Headquarters: Shenzhen, People's Republic of China
- Key people: LiXizhi, Chief Programmer/Founder; WangTian, Co-Founder
- Products: ParaEngine (Game Engine); 3D MMO for kids
- Revenue: 0
- Net income: 0
- Website: www.paraengine.com

ParaEngine Corporation is a technology and product company focusing on 3D virtual world technologies. It is usually referred to as P.E. for short. ParaEngine Co. is founded by LiXizhi in Shenzhen in the People's Republic of China. In 2009.10, it launched its first public product called Haqi Town, a creative social MMO for kids. In Haqi Town, each user has its own avatar, virtual land, and can build up their dream world easily. ParaEngine Corporation (P.E.) also focuses on the research and development of a distributed computer game engine called ParaEngine. Based on its proprietary game engine technologies, they are building various applications and are also working with licensed clients who use ParaEngine in their projects. They believe that game technology is the driving force to a new 3D Internet or Web3D.

== History ==
ParaEngine (the game engine) was initially written by LiXizhi from March 2004 when he was a student at Zhejiang University. In July 2005, he started ParaEngine Tech Studio in Shenzhen with a small group of people and fanacially supported by Shenzhen Tech Innovation International, until July 2007 when it was formally funded by a well known venture capital. In Jan, 2008 the investment is tripled.

== Product and Technology ==
ParaEngine develops and owns the following properties, the Game Engine, ParaWorld, NPL, MCML, ParaWorldAPI, KidsMovieCreator, Haqi Town, Paracraft, etc.

The ParaEngine Developer network or PEDN site hosts thousands of API and reference guides for the ParaWorld platform developers.

== News ==
2009.11.20: ParaEngine launched its first Web 3D product called Magic Haqi 魔法哈奇 (old: Haqi Town 哈奇小镇) (http://haqi.61.com) There are many kids generated 3d worlds, stories and movies, some of them can be viewed on a video site here

== See also ==
- Facebook
- Second Life
- Google Maps
