= Shenzhen Reservoir =

Reservoir in Guangdong

- 深圳水库 (Chinese)
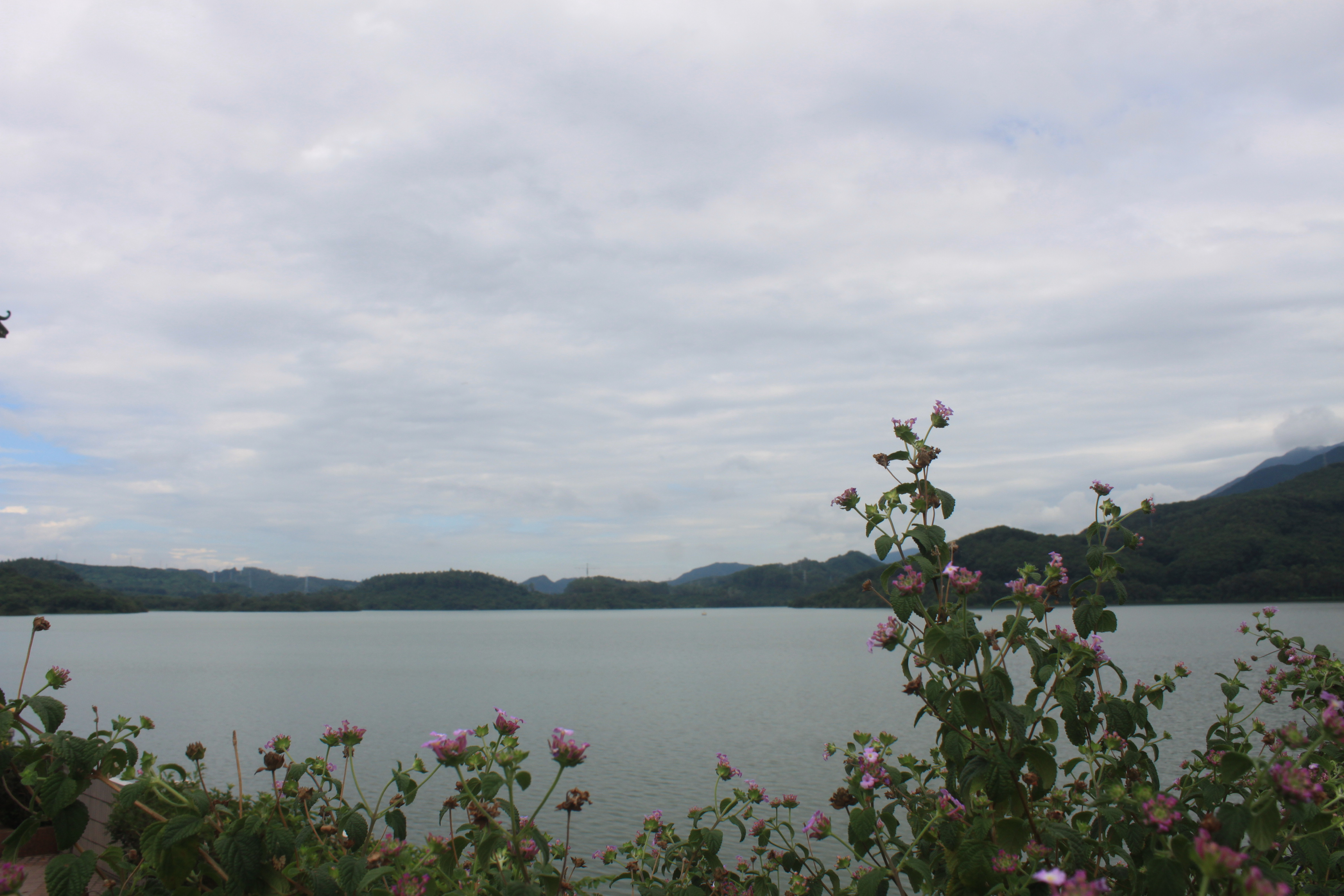
- View of Shenzhen Reservoir

- Location within Guangdong
- Location: Luohu District, Shenzhen, Guangdong
- Coordinates: 22°34′55″N 114°09′44″E
- Type: Reservoir
- Primary outflows: Sham Chun River
- Basin countries: China
- Built: March 1965
- First flooded: March 1965
- Surface area: 60.5 square kilometres (14,900 acres)
- Water volume: 45,770,000 cubic metres (12.09×10^{9} US gal)

Shenzhen Reservoir (simplified Chinese: 深圳水库; traditional Chinese: 深圳水庫; pinyin: Shēnzhèn Shuǐkù) is a reservoir located in Luohu District, Shenzhen, Guangdong, China. Shenzhen Reservoir is the largest man-made lake in Shenzhen. It belongs to the first grade water source protection area (一级水源保护区) and is part of Shenzhen's water supply network. The reservoir's drainage basin covers about 65 km^{2} of urban and forested land in southern Guangdong province.

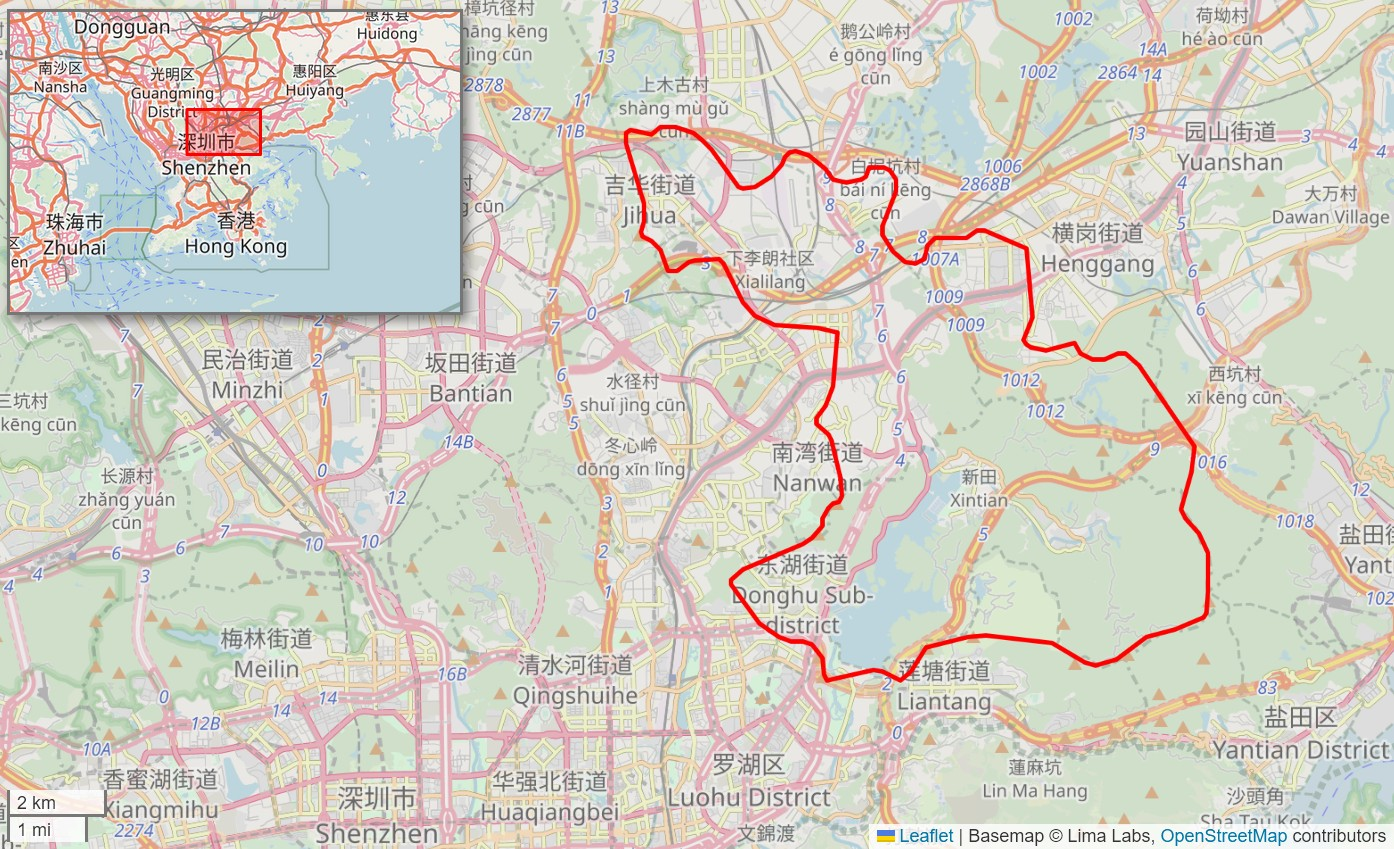
Drainage basin of the Shenzhen reservoir (Interactive map)

The reservoir borders Donghu Park and Fairy Lake Botanical Garden and drains the western slope of Mount Wutong. The reservoir discharges into Sham Chun River, the natural border between Hong Kong and Mainland China, together with the Sha Tau Kok River.

== History ==
Shenzhen Reservoir was built in March 1965 for irrigation and drinking water purposes.

== Public access ==
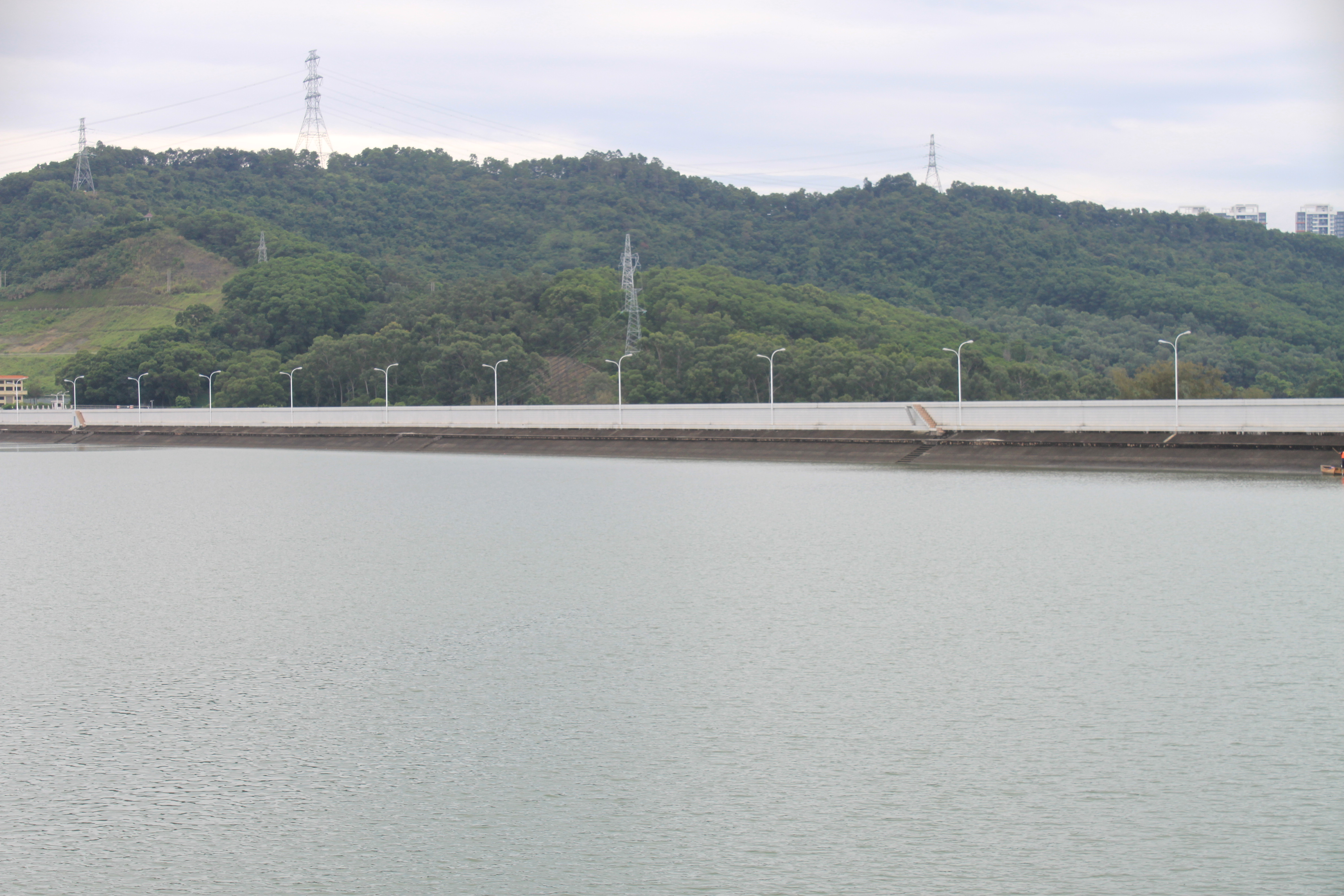
The dam of Shenzhen Reservoir.

Shenzhen Reservoir is open to the public from 6:00 pm to 9:00 pm every day.

Shenzhen Reservoir is a popular recreation area for hiking and tourism.

Nearby attractions include Donghu Park and Fairy Lake Botanical Garden.

== Transportation ==
Take bus No. 3, 17, 23, 29, 211, 308, 320, 351 to Shuiku Bus Stop (水库站).
