= Huangbeiling =

Area of Shenzhen, China

Huangbeiling (Chinese: 黄贝岭) is an area and former village in Luohu, Shenzhen, China. It was named after the neighbouring Huangbei Hill and the village dates back more than 650 years.

== See also ==
- Huangbeiling Station, the Shenzhen Metro Station serving the area
