= Panglin Plaza =

Skyscraper in Shenzhen, Guangdong, China

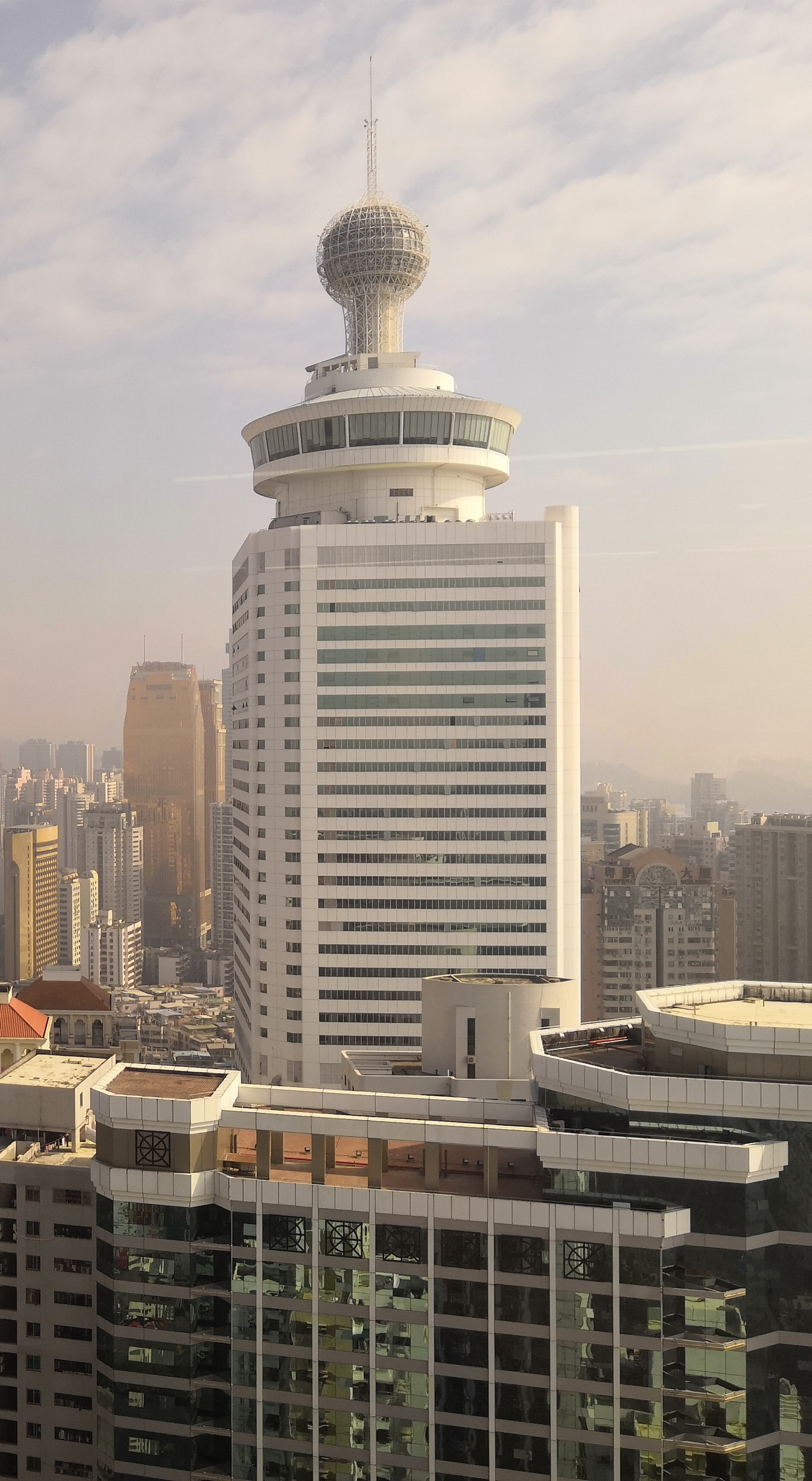
- The Panglin Hotel in December 2018

General information
- Location: Luohu District, Shenzhen, China
- Coordinates: 22°32′38.5″N 114°07′02″E
- Completed: 1999

Height
- Antenna spire: 240 m (790 ft)

Technical details
- Floor count: 57

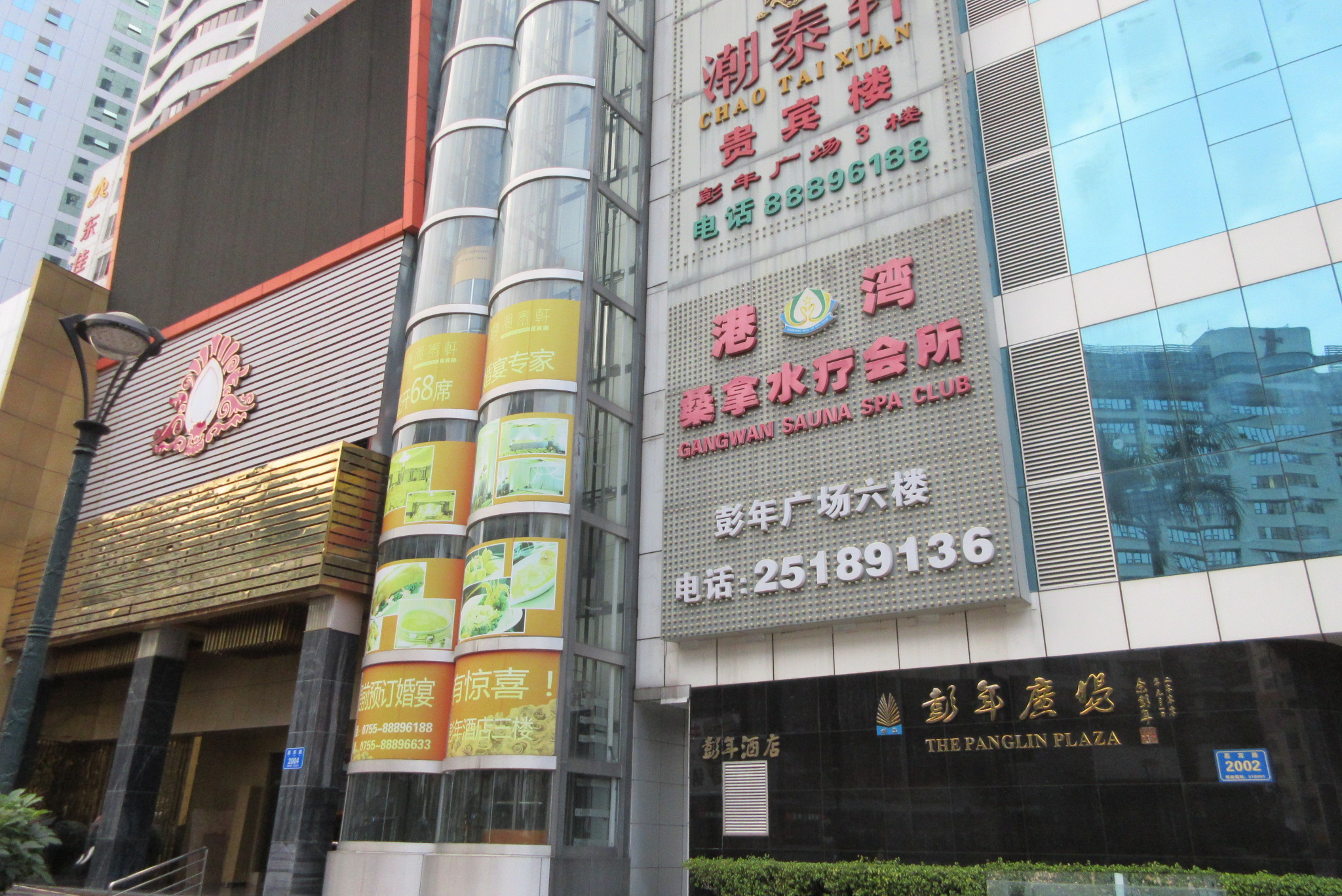
彭年廣場

Panglin Plaza (simplified Chinese: 彭年广场; traditional Chinese: 彭年廣場; pinyin: Péngnián Guǎngchǎng) is a 57-floor 240 metre (787 foot) tall skyscraper completed in 1999 located in Shenzhen, China. It served as The Hilton until April 2006, since then it is The PangLin Hotel.

== See also ==
- List of tallest buildings in the world
