= Fairy Lake Botanical Garden =

Botanical garden in Shenzhen, China

Fairylake Botanical Garden
- 仙湖植物园
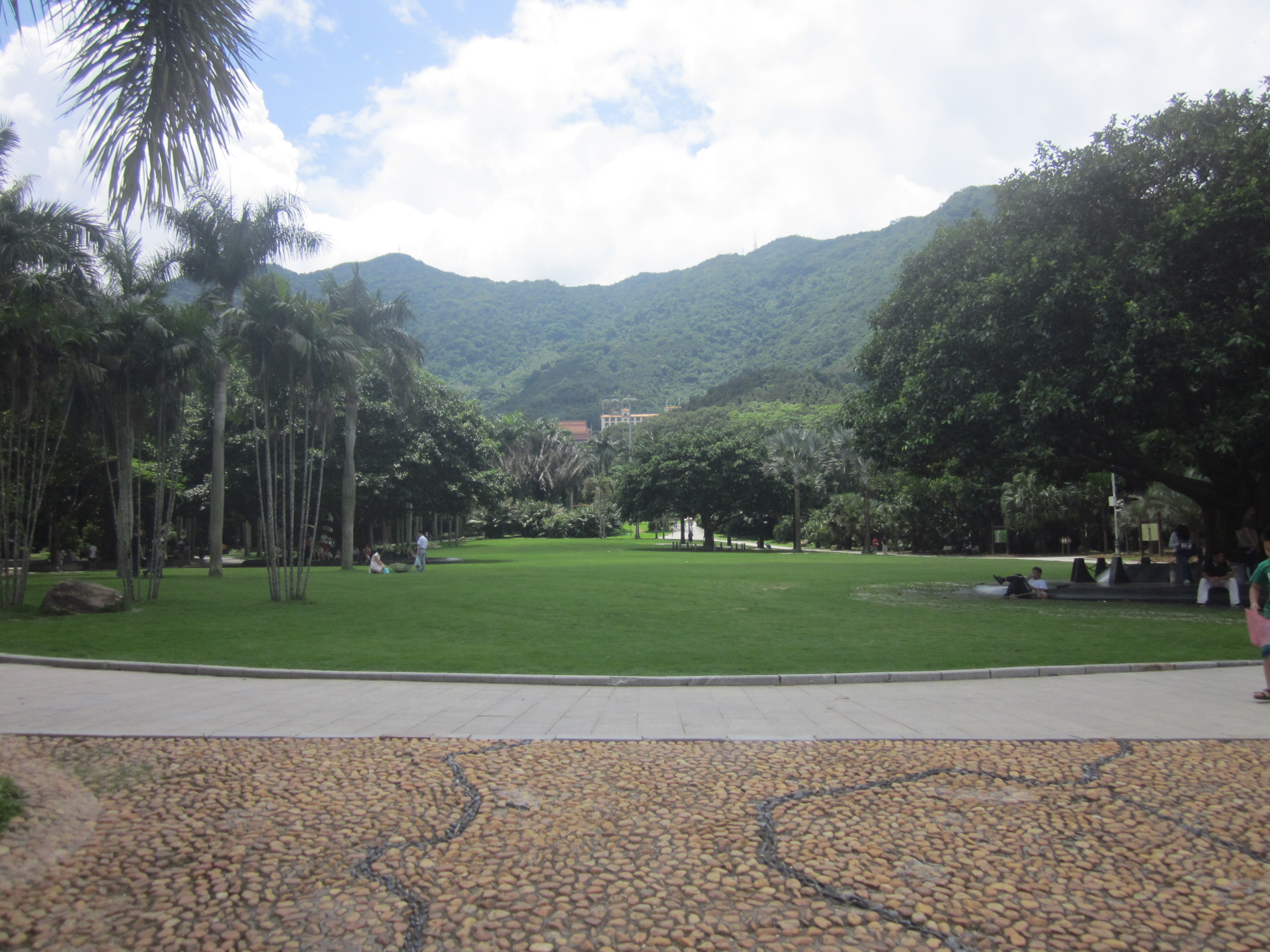
- Fairylake Botanical Garden

- Location within Guangdong
- Type: Public park, urban park
- Location: Liantang Subdistrict, Luohu District, Shenzhen, Guangdong
- Coordinates: 22°34′43.10″N 114°09′55.98″E
- Area: 1,349.20-acre (546.00 ha)
- Created: 1983
- Founder: Shenzhen government
- Operator: Shenzhen government
- Status: Open all year
- Website: www.szbg.org/english/index.asp

Chinese name
- Traditional Chinese: 仙湖植物園
- Simplified Chinese: 仙湖植物园
- Cantonese Yale: Sīnwùh jihkmaht'yùhn
Transcriptions
Standard Mandarin
- Hanyu Pinyin: Xiānhú zhíwùyuán
- Wade–Giles: Hsien^{1}-hu^{2} chih^{2}-wu^{4}-yüan^{2}
- IPA: [ɕjɛ́n.xǔ ʈʂɨ̌.û.ɥɛ̌n]
Yue: Cantonese
- Yale Romanization: Sīnwùh jihkmaht'yùhn
- Jyutping: sin1 wu4 zik6 mat6 jyun4
- IPA: [sin˥.wu˩ tsɪk̚˨.mɐt̚˨.jyn˩]

Fairylake Botanical Garden or Xianhu Botanical Garden (Chinese: 仙湖植物园) is a 1,349.20-acre (546.00 ha) botanical garden and arboretum located at Liantang Subdistrict, Luohu District, Shenzhen, Guangdong, China. The garden is located at the foot of Wutong Mountain, beside the Shenzhen Reservoir. It was categorized as a "national AAAA level tourist site" by the China National Tourism Administration in 2007 and a "national key park" by the Ministry of Housing and Urban-Rural Development in 2008.

== History ==
Founded in 1983, Fairylake Botanical Garden first opened to the public in 1988. It incorporates scientific research, science popularization, and tourism. As of 2012, there are more than 17 special-category living plant collections and more than 8,000 species of plants in the Fairylake Botanical Garden. On December 18, 2012, the National Cycad Conservation Center was set up here, it has cycads a total of 3 families, 10 genera, and 240 species, ranked second in the world.

=== Climate ===
Fairylake Botanical Garden is in the subtropical monsoon climate zone, with an average annual temperature of 23 °C (73 °F), a total annual rainfall of 1,608.1-millimetre (63.31 in), a frost-free period of 355 days and 1975 annual average sunshine hours. Spring, fall and winter are warm, while winter is relatively dry. The highest temperature is 36.6 °C (97.9 °F), and the lowest temperature 1.4 °C (34.5 °F).

== Gardens ==
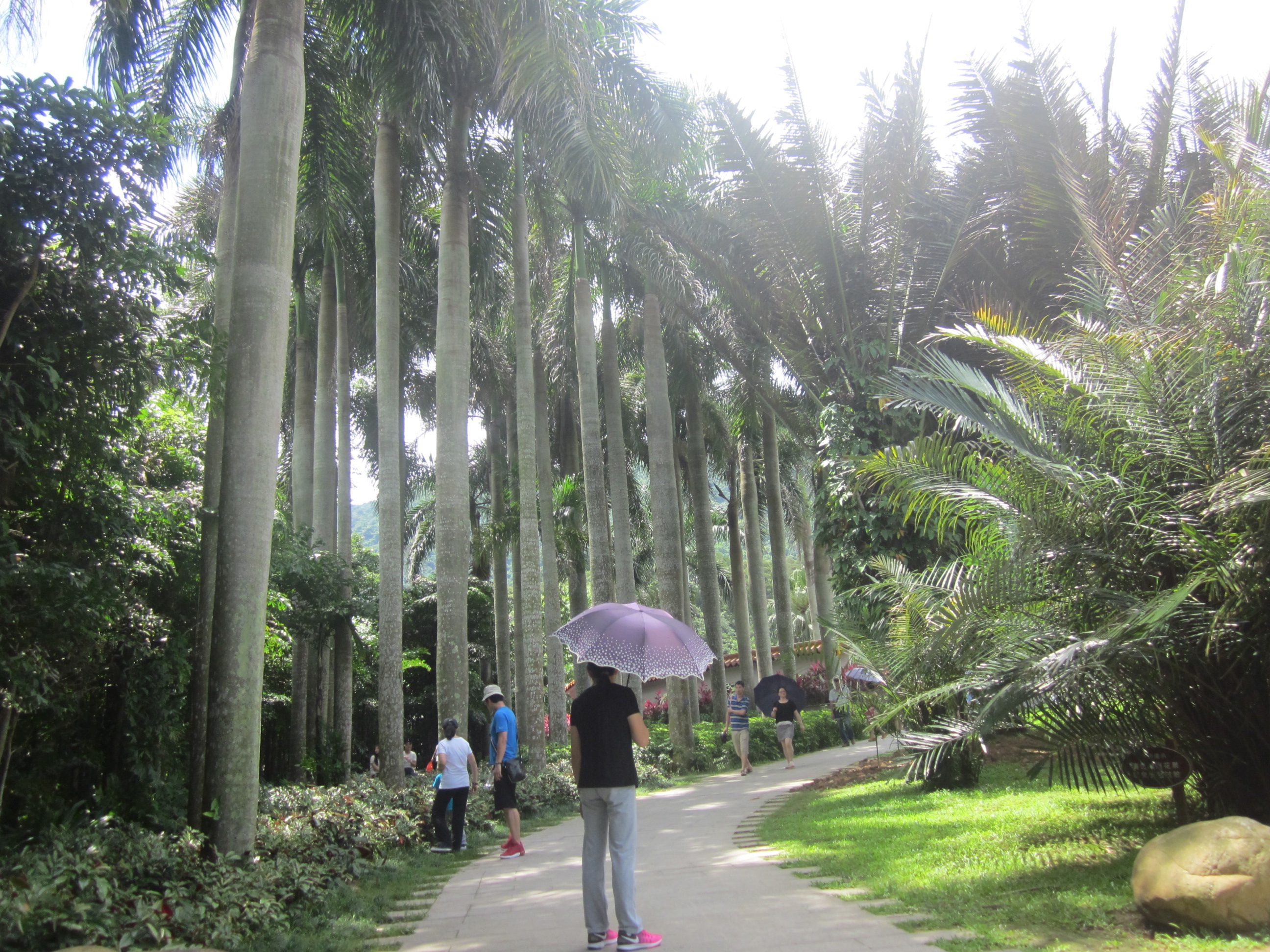
Arecaceae.

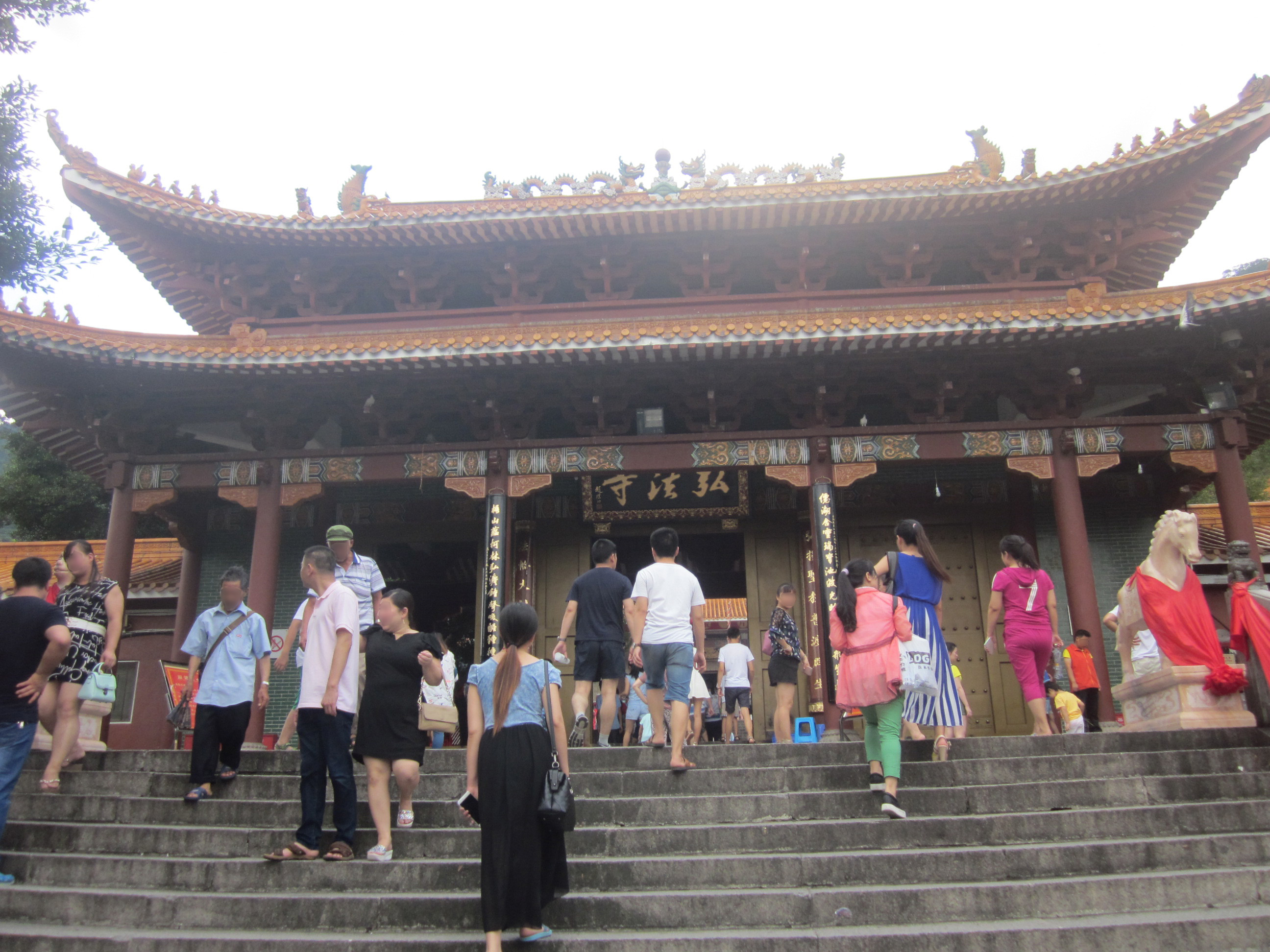
Shanmen of Hongfa Temple.

Fairylake Botanical Garden has more than twelve themed Gardens, such as:

- Cycad Conservation Center (苏铁保存中心)
- Magnolia Garden (木兰园)
- Rare Trees Garden (珍稀树木园)
- Arecaceae Garden (棕榈园)
- Bamboo Garden (竹区)
- Shade tolerance Garden (荫生植物区)
- Desert Plant Garden (沙漠植物区)
- Fruit Tree Area (百果园)
- Aquatic Plant Garden (水生植物园)
- Peach Garden (桃花园)
- Gymnosperm Garden (裸子植物区)
- Bonsai Garden (盆景园)

== Tourist attractions ==
Fairylake Botanical Garden is divided into six scenic areas, including the Heaven & Earth Area, the Fairylake Area, the Hongfa Temple Area, the Desert Plant Area, the Fossil Forest Area and the Conifers Azalea Area.

The Fairylake, also known as Lake Xian (Chinese: 仙湖; pinyin: Xiānhú), is a man-made lake with bridges, pagodas and halls all over the area.

Hongfa Temple is a Buddhist temple located within the Fairylake Botanical Garden.

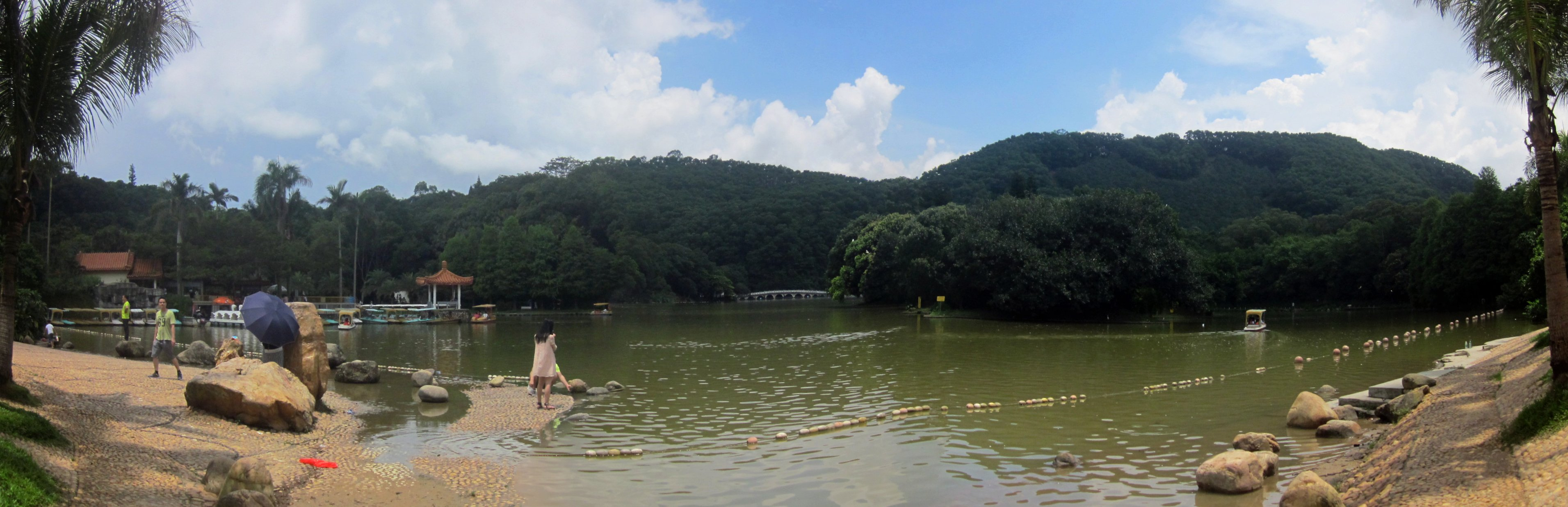
A panorama of Fairylake.

== Transportation ==
- Take bus No. 382, 363, 220, or 202 to Fairy Lake Botanical Garden Bus Stop (仙湖植物园站)
- Take bus No. N15, 27, 113, K113, 214, 311, 336, 363, 381, 382 or M468 to Luohu Foreign Language School Bus Stop (罗湖外国语学校站)
- Take subway Line 2/8 (Shekou Line) to get off at Xianhu Road metro station. Getting out from Exit C2 and walk to Fairy Lake Botanical Garden Bus Stop
