= Meilin Reservoir =

- Maxie Reservoir
- 梅林水库 (Chinese)
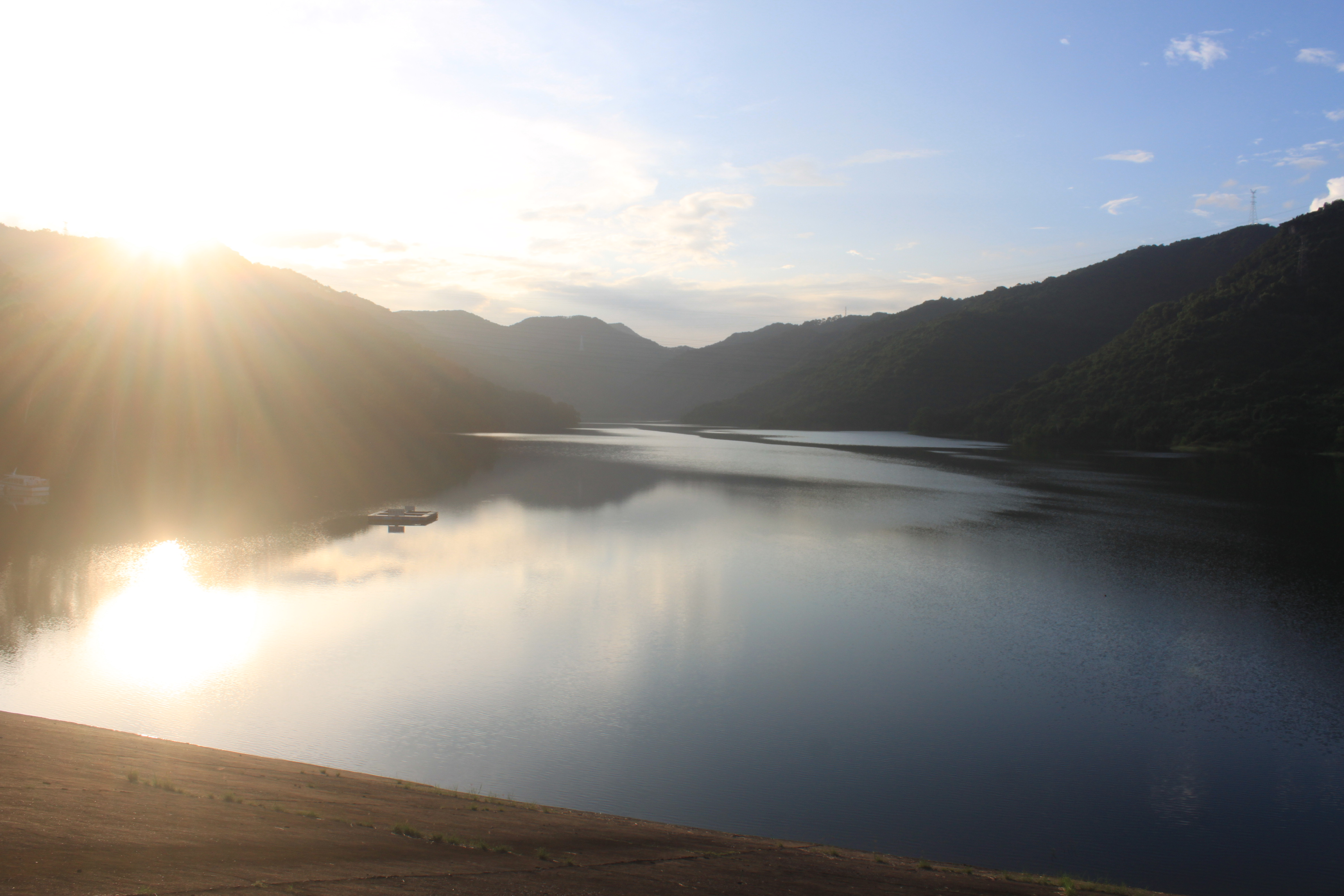
- Meilin Reservoir at sunset.

- Location within Guangdong
- Location: Futian District, Shenzhen, Guangdong
- Coordinates: 22°34′42″N 114°02′03″E
- Type: Reservoir
- Basin countries: China
- Built: 1956
- First flooded: 1956
- Surface area: 4.26 km^{2} (1,050 acres)
- Max. depth: 58.60 m (192.3 ft)
- Water volume: 1,309 million cubic metres (346×10^{9} US gal)

Meilin Reservoir (simplified Chinese: 梅林水库; traditional Chinese: 梅林水庫; pinyin: Meílín Shuǐkù) is a reservoir located in Futian District, in southwestern Shenzhen, Guangdong Province, in the southern China. Meilin Reservoir belongs to the first grade water source protection area (一级水源保护区) and is part of Shenzhen's water supply network. It covers a total surface area of 4.26 km^{2} (1.64 sq mi) and has a storage capacity of some 1,309×10^{6} m^{3} (0.314 cu mi) of water. It is surrounded by the Longding Hill (龙顶山).

== History ==
The reservoir was formed in June 1956 with the name of Maxie Reservoir (马泻水库; Mǎxiè Shuǐkù). In 1991 the Shenzhen Water Conservancy expanded the reservoir.

== Climate ==
Meilin Reservoir is in the subtropical maritime monsoon climate zone, total annual rainfall of 1944 mm, a frost-free period of 355 days, and annual average runoff is 430 km^{3} (100 cu mi). It enjoys a mild climate and has plenty of rainfall and sunshine. Every year from April to September is the flood season, rainfall accounted for 84.3% of the whole year.

== Public Access ==
The reservoir is open to public all day. It is a popular recreation area for fishing and tourism.

== Transportation ==
- Take bus No. 821 to Meilin Park Bus Stop (梅林公园站).
- Take Shenzhen Metro Line 9 to get off at Xiameilin station, getting out from Exit C and walk to Xiameilin Market Bus Stop (下梅林市场站) to transfer to bus No. 111 to Meilin First Village Bus Stop (梅林一村站).
- Take Shenzhen Metro Line 4 to get off at Shangmeilin station, getting out from Exit C and walk to Zhongkang Park Bus Stop (中康公园站) to transfer to bus No. 334 to Shangmeilin Market Bus Stop (上梅林市场站).

== Gallery ==
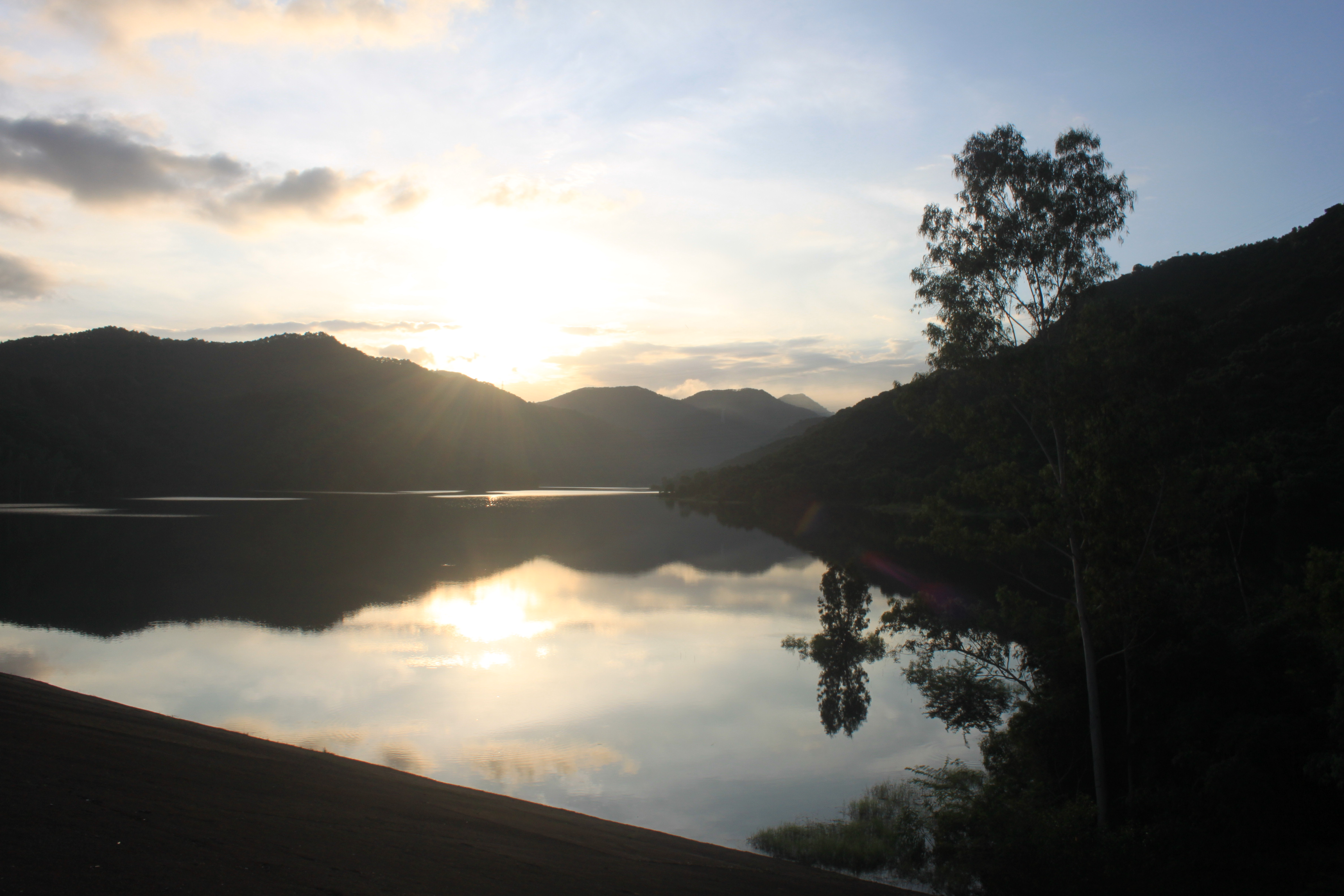
Meilin Reservoir at sunset.

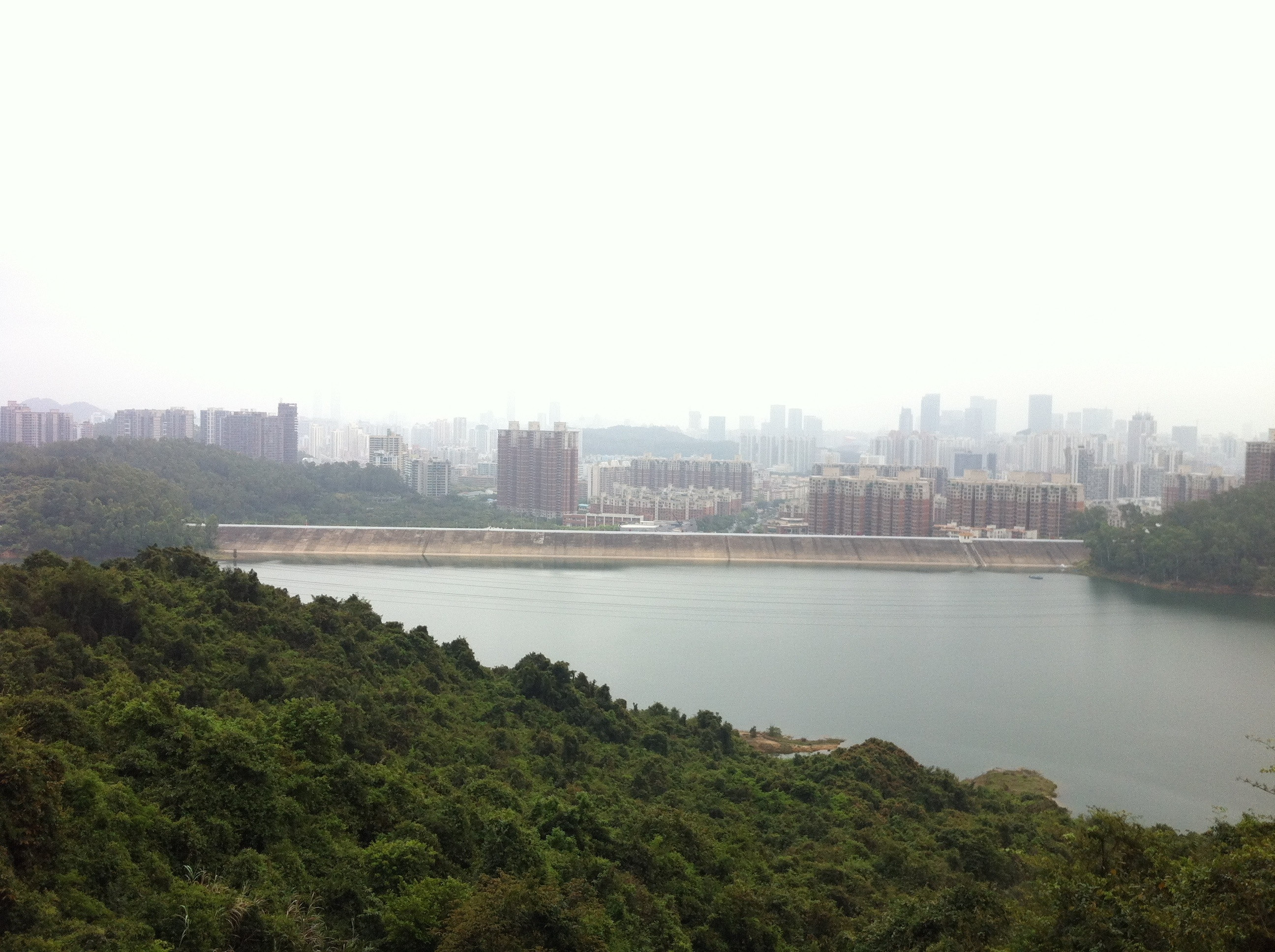
Meilin Reservoir

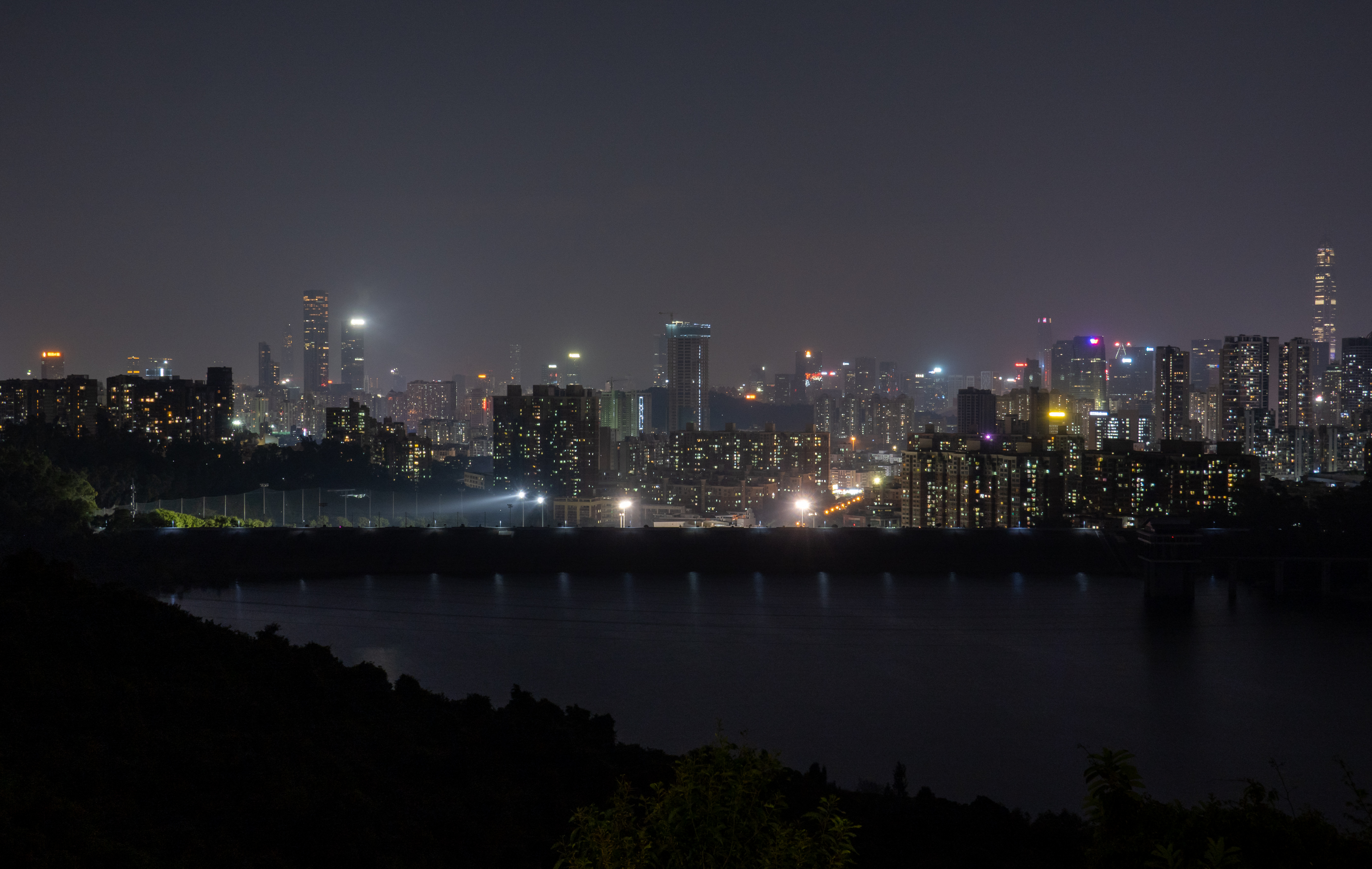
Meilin Reservoir night view
