= Mount Yangtai =

Mountain in Shenzhen, Guangdong, China

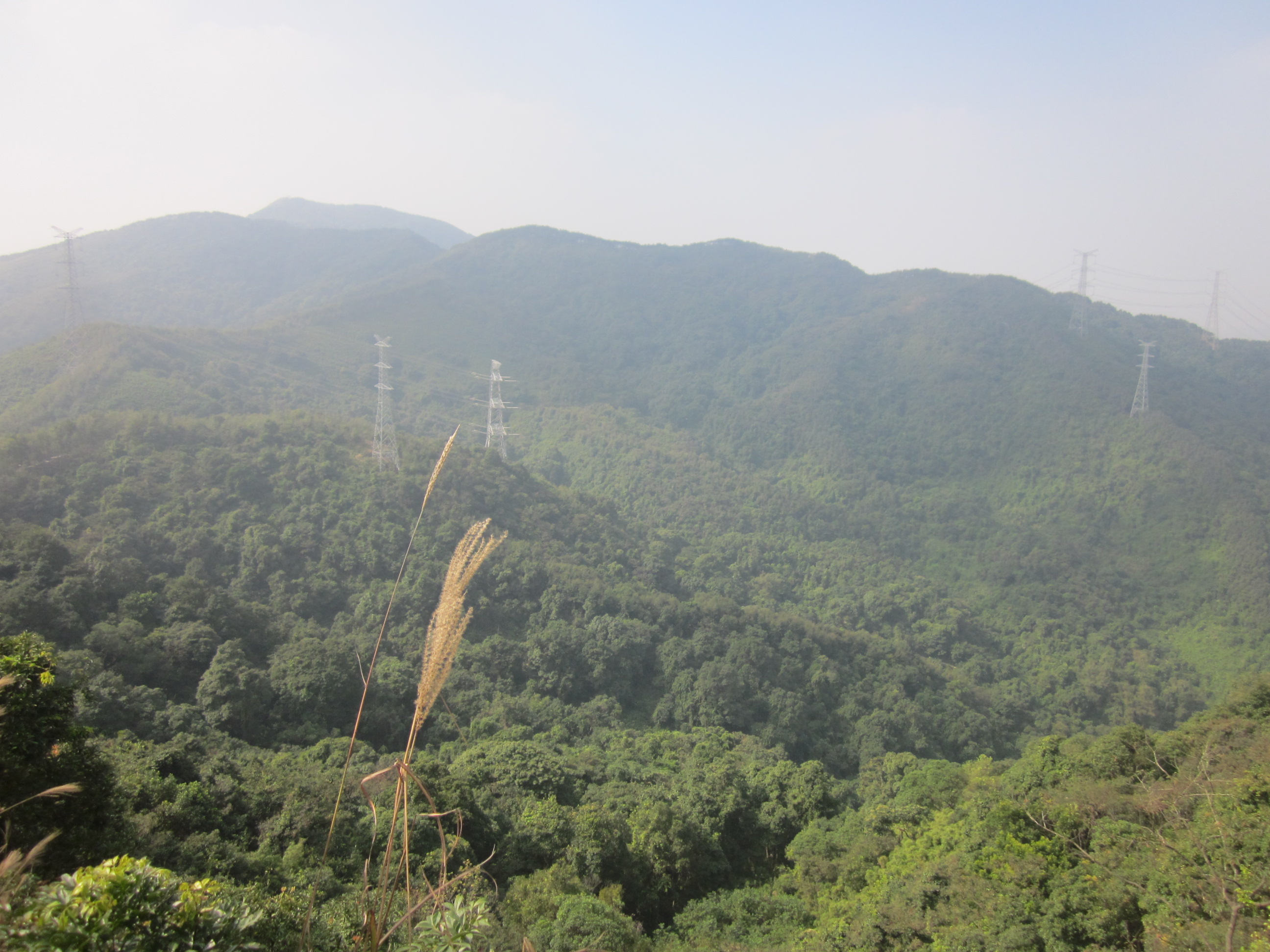
- Mount Big Yangtai.

Highest point
- Elevation: 587.3-metre (1,927 ft)
- Coordinates: 22°39′21.26″N 113°57′18.53″E

Naming
- Native name: 羊台山 (Chinese)

Geography
- Location within Guangdong
- Location: Shenzhen, Guangdong, China
- Parent range: Lianhua Mountains

The Mount Yangtai (Chinese: 羊台山; pinyin: Yángtaíshān), also known as Mount Yangtai Forest Park, is a mountain at the junction of Bao'an District and Nanshan District in Shenzhen, Guangdong, China. The peak is 587.3 metres (1,927 ft) in elevation, which is the highest peak in western Shenzhen. In 2008 The mount is rated as one of the eight scenic spots of Shenzhen by the Shenzhen government.

== History ==
During the Second Sino-Japanese War, the local people and Dongjiang Column rescued many cultural celebrities, including Mao Dun, He Xiangning, and Zou Taofen.

== Geography ==
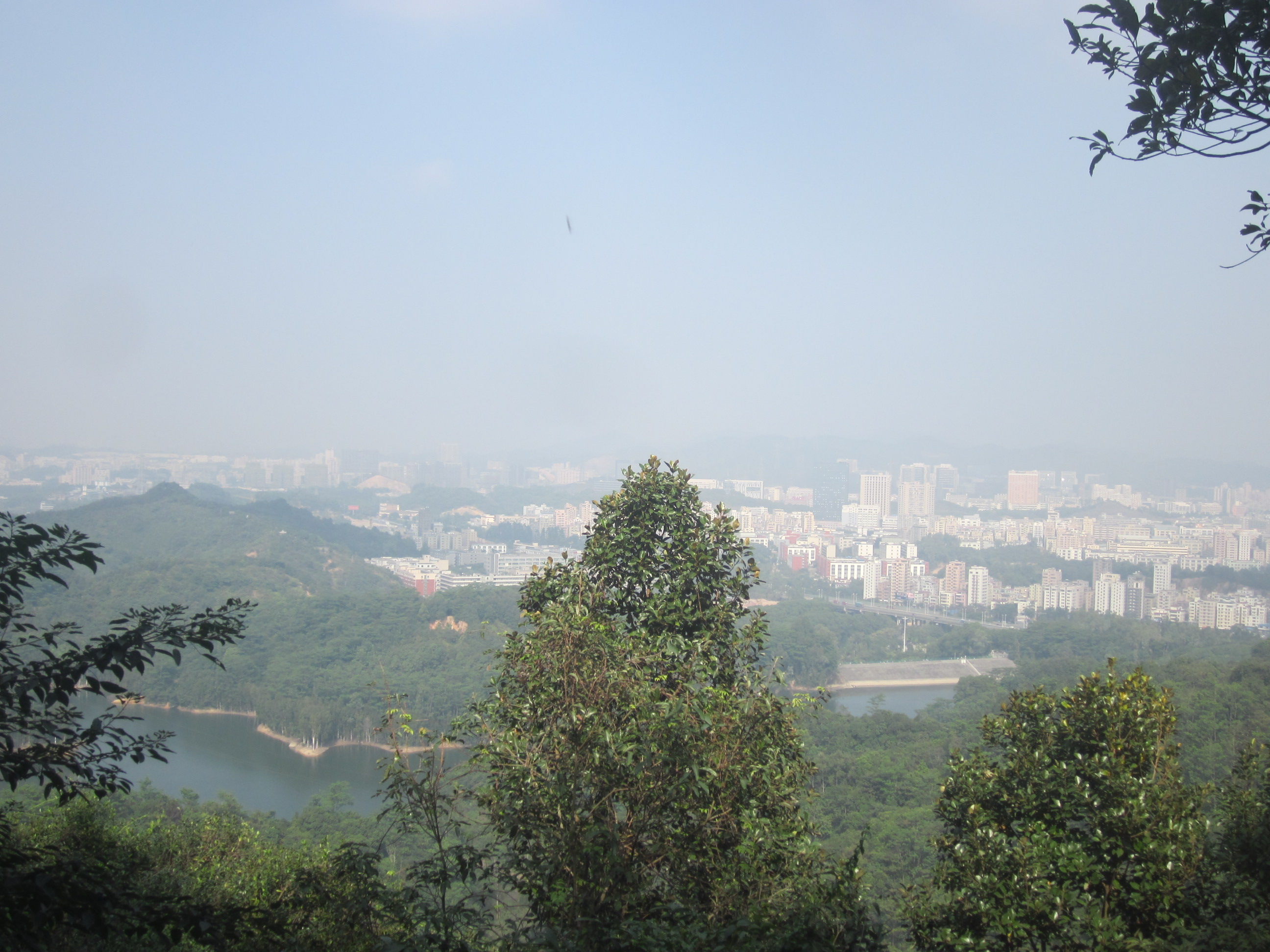
Laiwushan Reservoir at the foot of Mount Yangtai.

Mount Yangtai abounds with secondary south subtropical rain forest and monsoon evergreen broad-leaved forest.

=== Climate ===
The Mount Yangtai is in the subtropical monsoon climate zone, with an average annual temperature of 22.4 °C (72.3 °F), a total annual rainfall of 1,948.6-millimetre (76.72 in), and 2120 annual average sunshine hours. The highest temperature is 36.6 °C (97.9 °F), and the lowest temperature is 1.4 °C (34.5 °F).

=== Streams ===
Rivers with headwaters on the mountain include: Shiyan Stream (石岩河), Baimang Stream (白芒河) and Mashan Stream (麻山河).

=== Reservoirs ===
Shiyan Reservoir, Xili Reservoir (西丽水库), Tiegang Reservoir (铁岗水库), Gaofeng Reservoir (高峰水库), and Laiwushan Reservoir are located at the foot of Mount Yangtai.

== Transportation ==
- Take bus No. 101, 226, 104, M203, 240, B796 from Nanshan District to Xili Lake Station
- Take bus No. 332, 624, 882, or m233 from Longhua Bus Station to Yangtaishan Station
