= Lianhuashan Park =

Public park in Shenzhen, China

Coordinates: 22.555°N 114.05°E

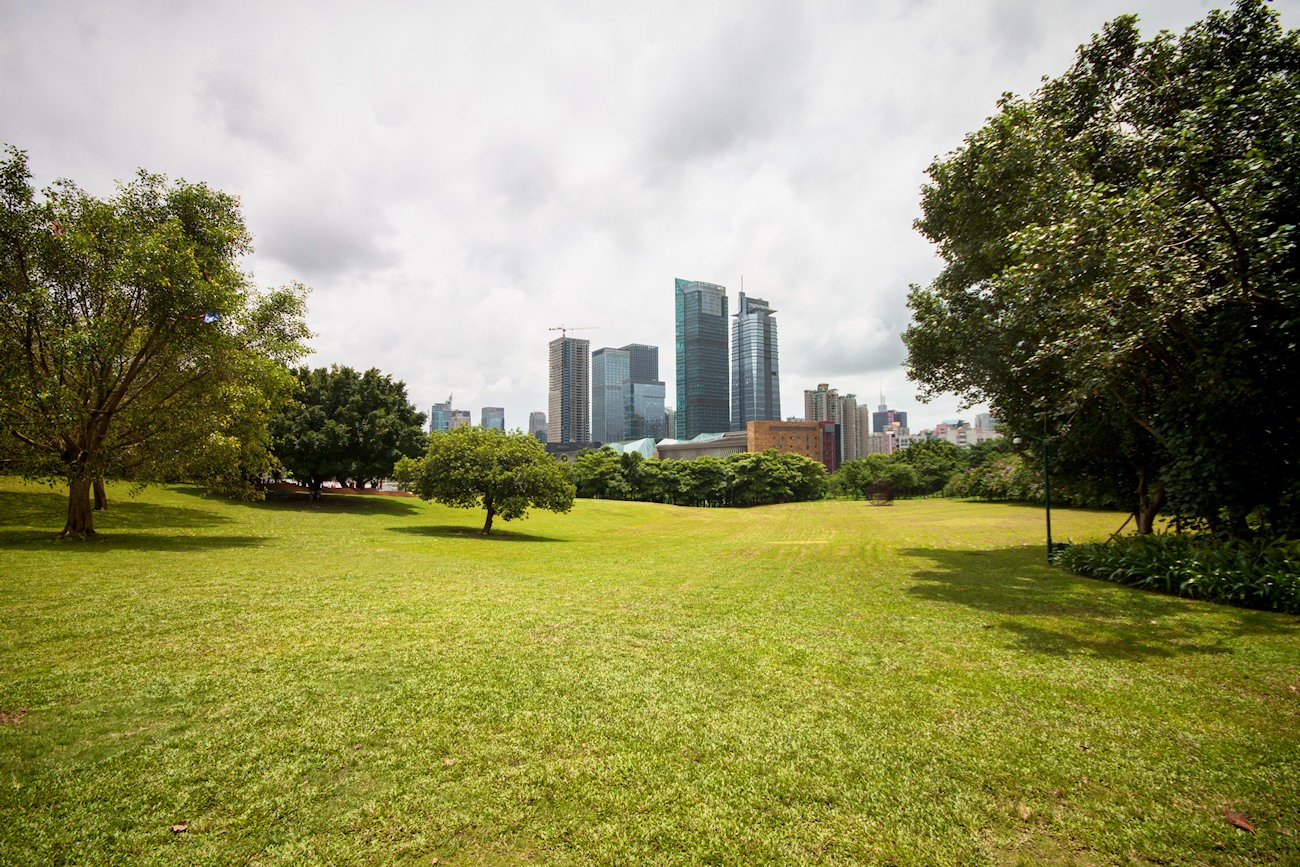
- Lianhuashan Park and skyscrapers within Futian CBD in the distance
- Interactive map of Lianhuashan Park
- Location: Futian, Shenzhen, China
- Area: 150 hectares (370 acres)
- Created: 1997
- Status: Open

Lianhua Hill ('Lianhuashan')
- Simplified Chinese: 莲花山
- Traditional Chinese: 蓮花山
- Postal: Linfa Hill
Transcriptions
Standard Mandarin
- Hanyu Pinyin: Liánhuā Shān
- Wade–Giles: Lien^{2}-hua^{1} Shan^{1}
Yue: Cantonese
- Jyutping: lin4 faa1 saan1

Lianhuashan Park (Chinese: 莲花山公园; pinyin: Liánhuāshān Gōngyuán; lit. 'Lotus Hill Park') is a hill and urban park in Shenzhen, China, inaugurated in 1997. It is located at the northern end of the Futian Central Business District and covers an area of 150 hectares (370 acres). It is within walking distance from Children's Palace Station of the Shenzhen Metro.

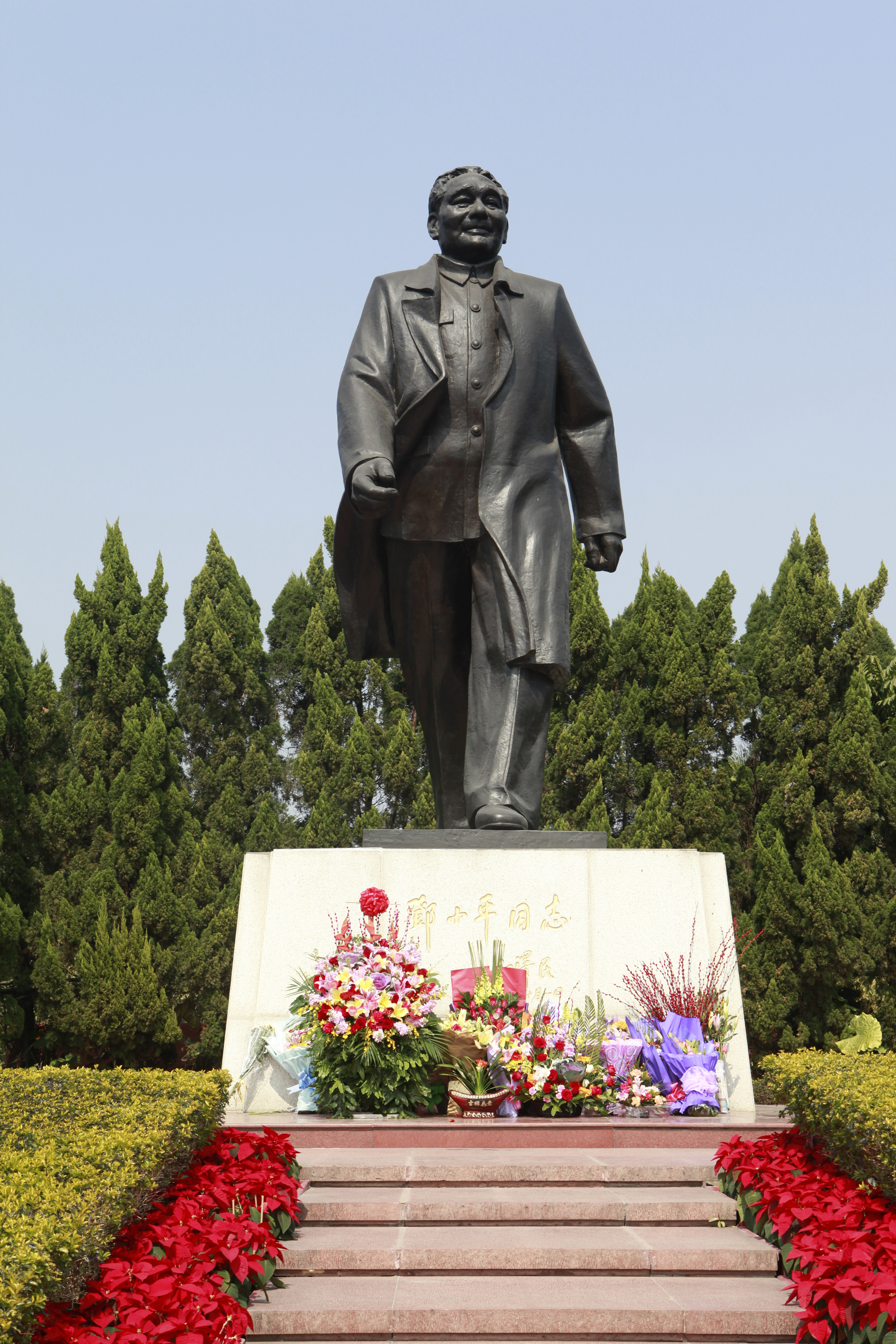
Statue of Deng Xiaoping in Lianhuashan Park

== Statue of Deng Xiaoping ==
A 6-meter-high statue of former Chinese leader Deng Xiaoping stands on a hilltop at the center of the park and dominates the monumental perspective of Futian, marking the northern end of an axial composition that evokes urban design patterns of Imperial China. It was created by sculptor Teng Wenjing following a 1995 decision by the Shenzhen Municipal Committee to erect a memorial to Deng that would be inaugurated on the 20th anniversary of Shekou Special Economic Zone. As the project generated controversy, the statue was kept for some time in a warehouse while its fate remained unclear, until it was eventually unveiled in November 2000 in the presence of CCP general secretary Jiang Zemin.

The statue shows Deng walking briskly, a reference to his words that "The step of reform and opening-up should be bigger." On its pedestal is a calligraphy by Deng's successor Jiang Zemin. The statue is 6 metres tall and weighs six tons.

The statue was visited by Premier Li Keqiang in 2015 and by CCP general secretary Xi Jinping in 2020 as they paid homage to Deng's role in Shenzhen's development.

== See also ==
- List of parks in Shenzhen
