= Dasha River (Guangdong) =

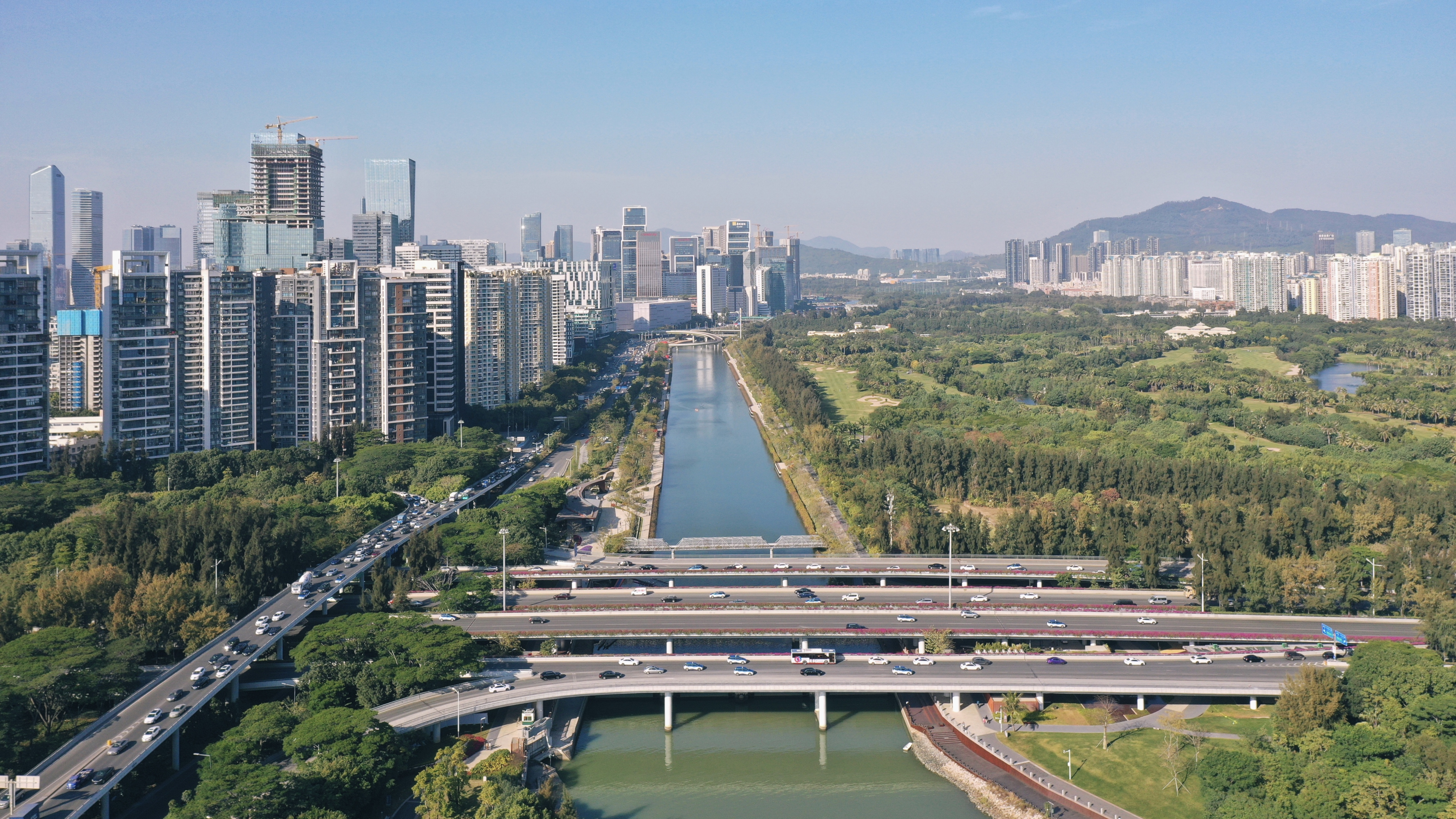
- The Dasha Ecological Corridor near by Shenzhen Bay.
- Native name: 大沙河 (Chinese)

Location
- Country: China
- Province: Guangdong
- City: Shenzhen

Physical characteristics
- Source
  - location: Mount Yangtai
  - coordinates: 22°32′21.066″N 113°57′47.2104″E
- Mouth
  - location: Shenzhen Bay
  - coordinates: 22°31′29.2764″N 113°57′42.9984″E
- Length: 18.8 km (11.7 mi)

Dasha River (Chinese: 大沙河; pinyin: Dàshāhé) is a river in southwestern Shenzhen in Guangdong, China. It is 18.8 kilometres (11.7 mi) long and drains an area of 90.69 square kilometres (35.02 sq mi). It rises in Mount Yangtai, and flows generally southwest, passing through the Nanshan District and emptying into the South China Sea in Shenzhen Bay.

== Tributaries ==
The Changlingpi Stream (长岭皮河) is a largest tributary to Dasha River, it rises in Changlingpi Reservoir (长岭皮水库).

== Environmental concerns ==
As the only river flowing through Nanshan District, Dasha River is a receiving waters of industrial wastewater and domestic sewage in the district. Although the river training works has been going on for more than 8 years, but it has not been effective and the trend year-on-year increase.
