= List of roads in Nanshan, Shenzhen =

The following is an incomplete list of notable streets, roads, avenues, boulevards and expressways in the district of Nanshan, Shenzhen, Guangdong, China.

== List ==
Name	Notes	Photo
Baishi Road (白石路)		
Beihuan Boulevard (北环大道) (Also runs through Futian and Luohu)	Main article: Beihuan Boulevard	
Binhai Boulevard (滨海大道)	Main article: Binhai Boulevard	
Chuangye Road (创业路)		
Dongbin Road (东滨路)	Main article: Dongbin Road	
Haichang Street (海昌街)	Hai Chang street is a short street in Shekou, connecting Gongyuan road South (公园路南) to Xinghua Road (兴华路). It consists of a number of tailor shops on either side and leads on to Sea World through Xinghua Road and is close to the Shui Wan Metro station. Prior to 2018 Haichang Street was a red light district.	
Houhaibin Road (后海滨路)	Houhaibin Road runs from Wanghai Road to Nanhai Boulevard.	
Gongyuan North Road (公园北路)	Gongyuan North Road (Chinese: 公园北路; pinyin: Gong Yuan Bei Lu) is a two kilometer long, six lane road in Shekou, Nanshan. It runs from Sihai park (Gongye 8th road) to Wanghai road near Coastal Rose garden. The road runs along some prominent schools in Shekou, namely Shenzhen American International school and a second branch of QSI school Shenzhen.	
Guimiao Road (桂庙路)	Guimiao Road runs from Yueliangwan Boulevard to Nanshan Boulevard where it becomes Binhai Boulevard. It is about 1.4 kilometers in length and currently undergoing a major reconstruction in transforming the road into an underground expressway Nanshan Station, An Interchange station of the Shenzhen Metro is also under construction at its junction with Nanshan Boulevard	
Nanhai Boulevard (南海大道)	Main article: Nanhai Boulevard	
Nanshan Boulevard (南山大道)	Main article: Nanshan Boulevard	
Nantou Street (南头街)		
Nanxin Road (南新路)	Nanxin Road (Chinese: 南新路) runs from Dongbin Road in the south and ending north at Shennan Road, near Nantou. It is about 3 kilometers in length.	
Qianhai Road (前海路)	Qianhai Road (Chinese: 前海路) runs from Mianshan Road near Xiaonanshan to Shennan Road near Zhongshan Park. It runs largely parallel to Yueliangwan Boulevard. Qianhai Road Station of the Shenzhen Metro Line 9 is under construction at its intersection with Dongbin Road. It was built in the early 1990s and the portion south of Dongbin Road was formerly known as Liwan Road (荔湾路).	
Shahe East Road (沙河东路)	Shahe East Road is a north–south road from Binhai Boulevard to Longjin Road.	
Shahe West Road (沙河西路)	Shahe West Road (Chinese: 沙河西路) runs north from Baimang to the junction with Dongbin Road, near Shenzhen Bay Port, from where it becomes Wanghai Road. Being roughly 12 kilometers in length it is the longest road in Nanshan.	
Shennan Road (深南路) (Also runs through Futian and Luohu)	Main article: Shennan Road (Known as Shennan Boulevard in Nanshan and parts of Futian)	
Taoyuan Road (桃园路)	Taoyuan Road runs from Qianhai to Nanhai Boulevard near the main gate of Shenzhen University. The Government of Nanshan is located at 2 Taoyuan Road. Daxin Station and Taoyuan Station of the Shenzhen Metro are located at its junction with Qianhai Road and Nanshan Boulevard respectively	
Wanghai Road (望海路)	Main article: Wanghai Road	
Xinghua Road (兴华路)	Xinghua Road (simplified Chinese: 兴华路; pinyin: Xīnghuá Lù) is a road in the southern part of Shekou, Nanshan, Shenzhen, China. It leads to the Sea World Station Shenzhen Metro on the southern side and runs through a predominantly office and subsequently residential area, with restaurants on one side.	
Xuefu Road (学府路)	Xuefu Road (Chinese: 学府路) runs from Qianhai near Shenzhen West railway station to Keyuan South Road near Keyuan Metro Station.	

== See also ==
- Transport in Shenzhen
