= Nanhai Boulevard =

Road in Shenzhen, China

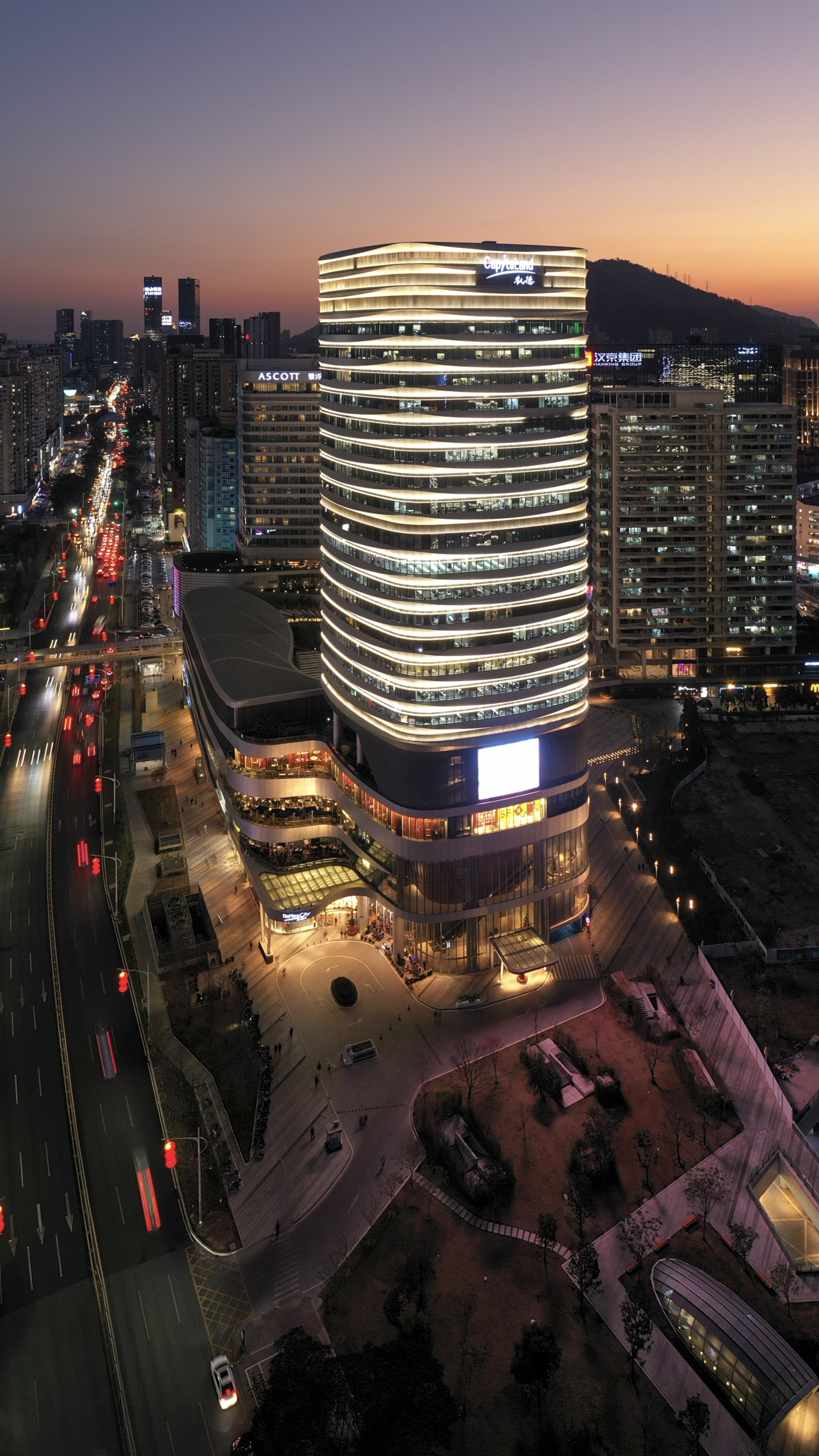
- Nanhai Boulevard with Capitaland Raffles City Mall
- Native name: 南海大道 (Chinese)

Other
- Status: Complete

Nanhai Boulevard (Chinese: 南海大道) is a major north-south thoroughfare in Nanshan District, Shenzhen, China. It runs from the southern tip of Nantou Peninsula near Shekou Passenger Terminal north to the junction of Guangshen Expressway, where it becomes Tongle Road which extends into Nanping Expressway. It spans about 8 kilometers in length. It was formed by merging Nanyou Boulevard (南油大道), Gongye Boulevard (工业大道) and Qilin Road (麒麟路) in 2004.

== Major junctions ==
- Wanghai Road
- Dongbin Road
- Binhai Boulevard (flyover)
- Shennan Road (flyover)
- Beihuan Boulevard (flyover)
- Guangshen Expressway

== Notable sites along the road ==
- Shenzhen University
- Lixiang Park
- Shekou Passenger Terminal
- Nanhai Hotel
- Shekou Walmart
- Shekou Internet Valley
- Times Plaza
