= Dongbin Road =

Road in China

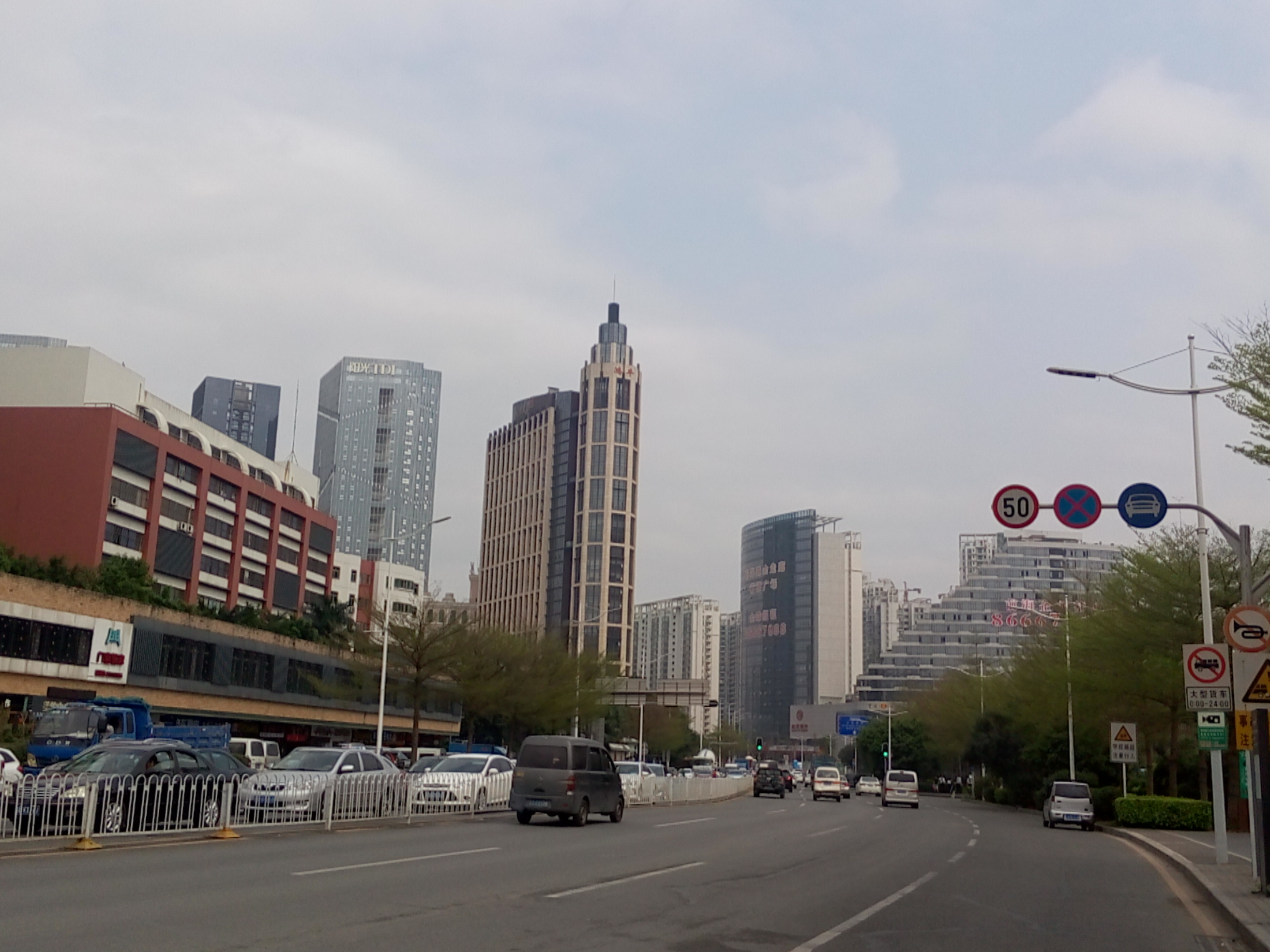
Dongbin Road at the intersection with Qianhai Road

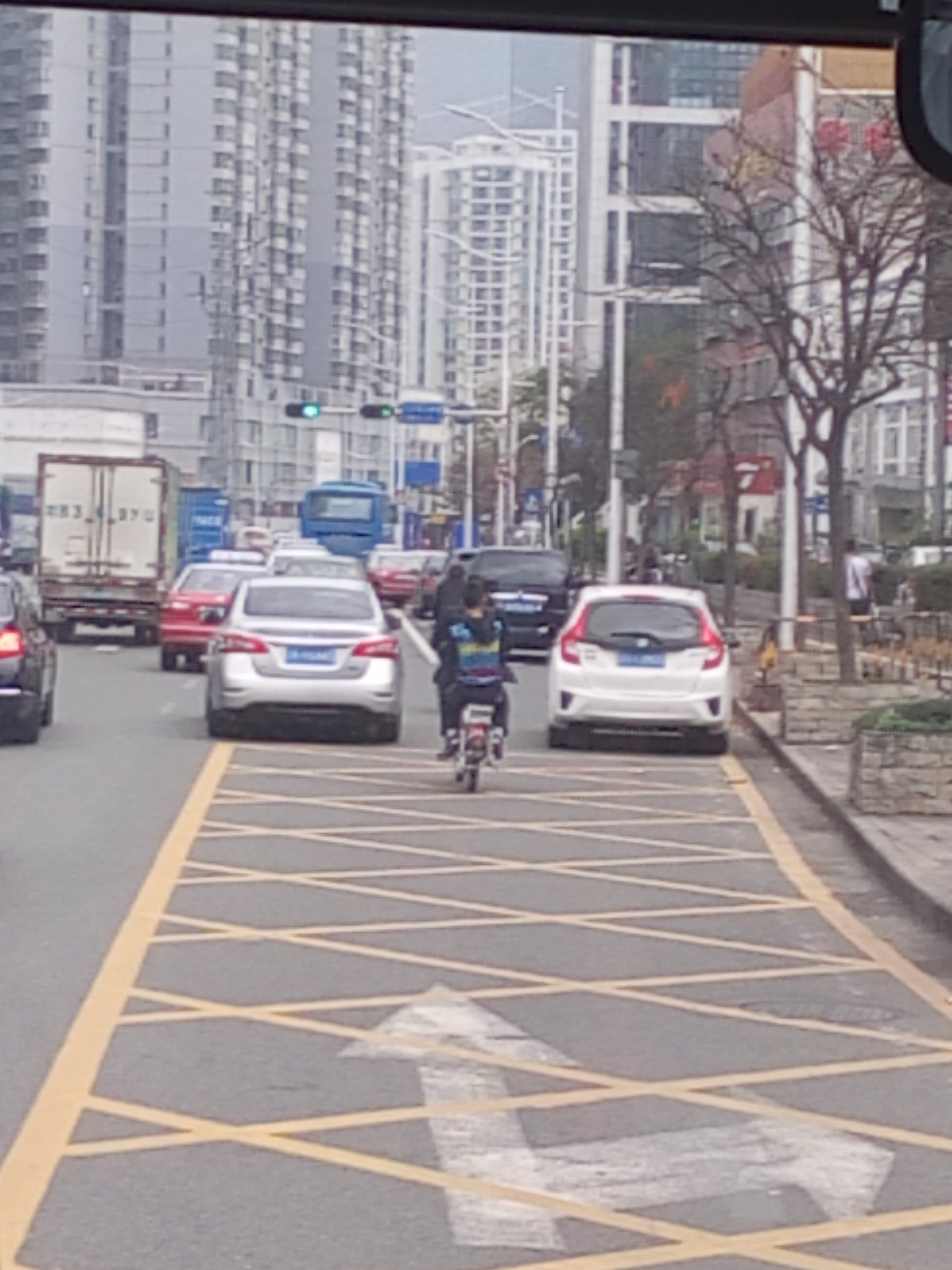
Dongbin Road

Dongbin Road (Chinese: 东滨路) is a major east-west road in Nanshan, Shenzhen, China. It starts west from Yueliangwan Boulevard in Qianhai and terminates at Shenzhen Bay Port in Dongjiaotou, which in turn is connected to Hong Kong via the Shenzhen Bay Bridge. A large portion of the Dongbin Tunnel is constructed under the street, which also runs to Shenzhen Bay Port. A number of the under construction Shenzhen Metro Line 9 stations will as well run underneath the road. The portion between Yueliangwan Boulevard and Nanhai Boulevard was named Neihuan Road (内环路) before 2004.

== Major Junctions ==
- Qianhai Road
- Nanshan Boulevard
- Nanhai Boulevard
- Houhai Boulevard
- Houhaibin Road

== Places along the road ==
- Nanshan (mountain)
- One Shenzhen Bay
- Shenzhen Bay Port
