= Wanghai Road =

Road in Shenzhen, China

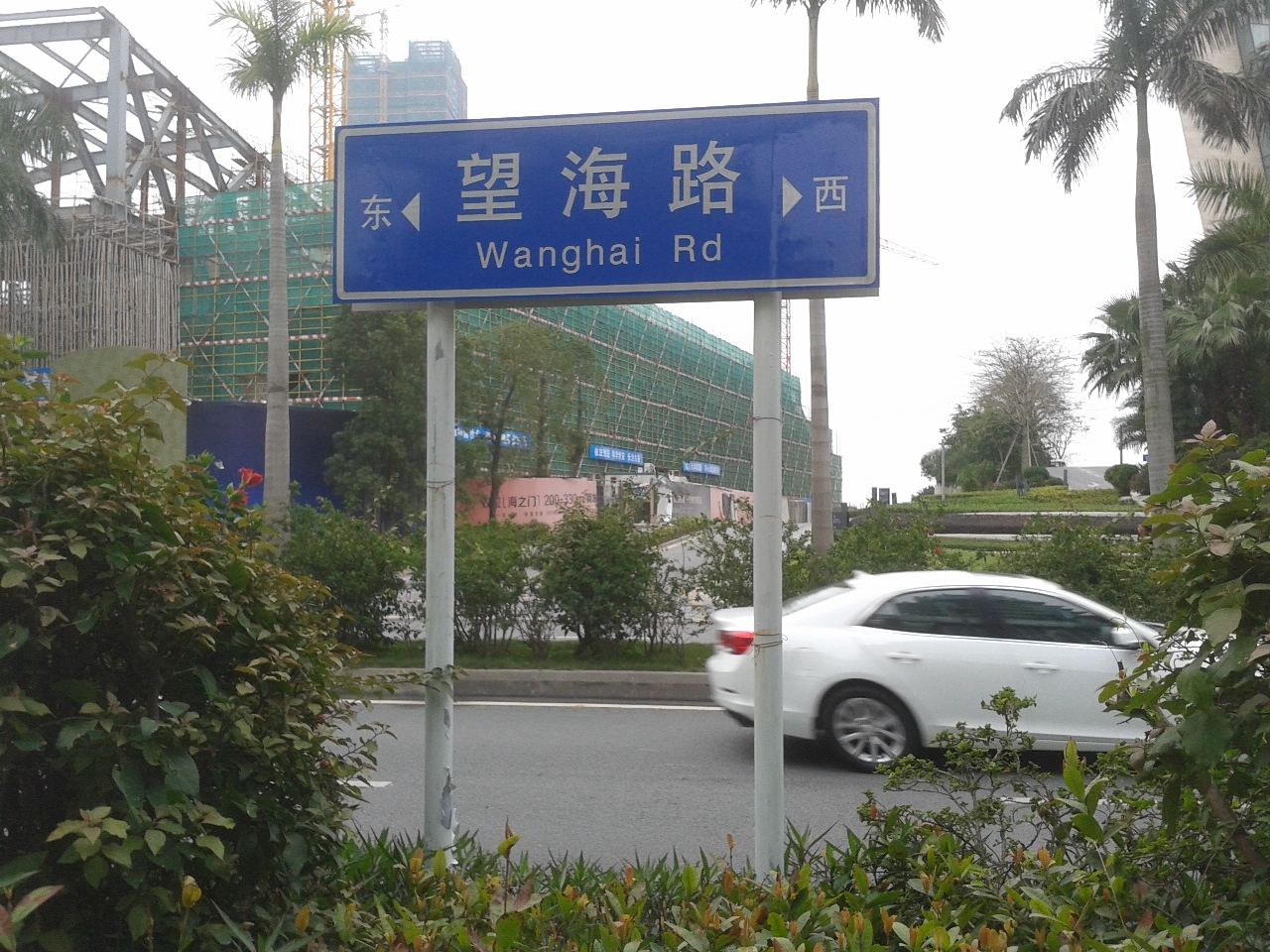
Wanghai Road, Shenzhen

Wanghai Road (Chinese: 望海路; pinyin: Wàng Hǎi Lù) is a road along the southern coastline of Shekou, Nanshan, in the South China city of Shenzhen (in Guangdong Province, China).

Wanghai Road is 6.6 kilometres long and runs nearly throughout the east coast of Shekou. It stretches from at Shekou Sea World in the South, runs along the upmarket residences of Nanhai Rose Garden (南海玫瑰园; Nánhǎi Méiguī Yuán) and Coastal Rose Garden and terminates at the promenade on the northern end of Shekou at Dongbin Road (东滨路) at Shenzhen Bay Park.

== Notable places along the road ==
A number of Chinese and expat residences lie along Wanghai Road, including:

- Hai Xin Flower Garden (海欣花园)
- Coastal Rose Garden (南海玫瑰花园)
- Peninsula City
- Shekou International School
- Shenzhen Bay Park
- Imperial Park
- Hilton Hotel (Shekou)
- Sea World (Shenzhen)

== See also ==
- Binhai Boulevard, a major expressway also running along the southern coastline of Nanshan
- Xinghua Road, Shenzhen
