= Nanshan Mountains =

Mountain range in Shenzhen, China

Coordinates: 22.5083°N 113.9014°E

- Chinese: 南山
- Literal meaning: Southern Mountain(s)
Transcriptions
Standard Mandarin
- Hanyu Pinyin: Nánshān
- Wade–Giles: Nan Shan

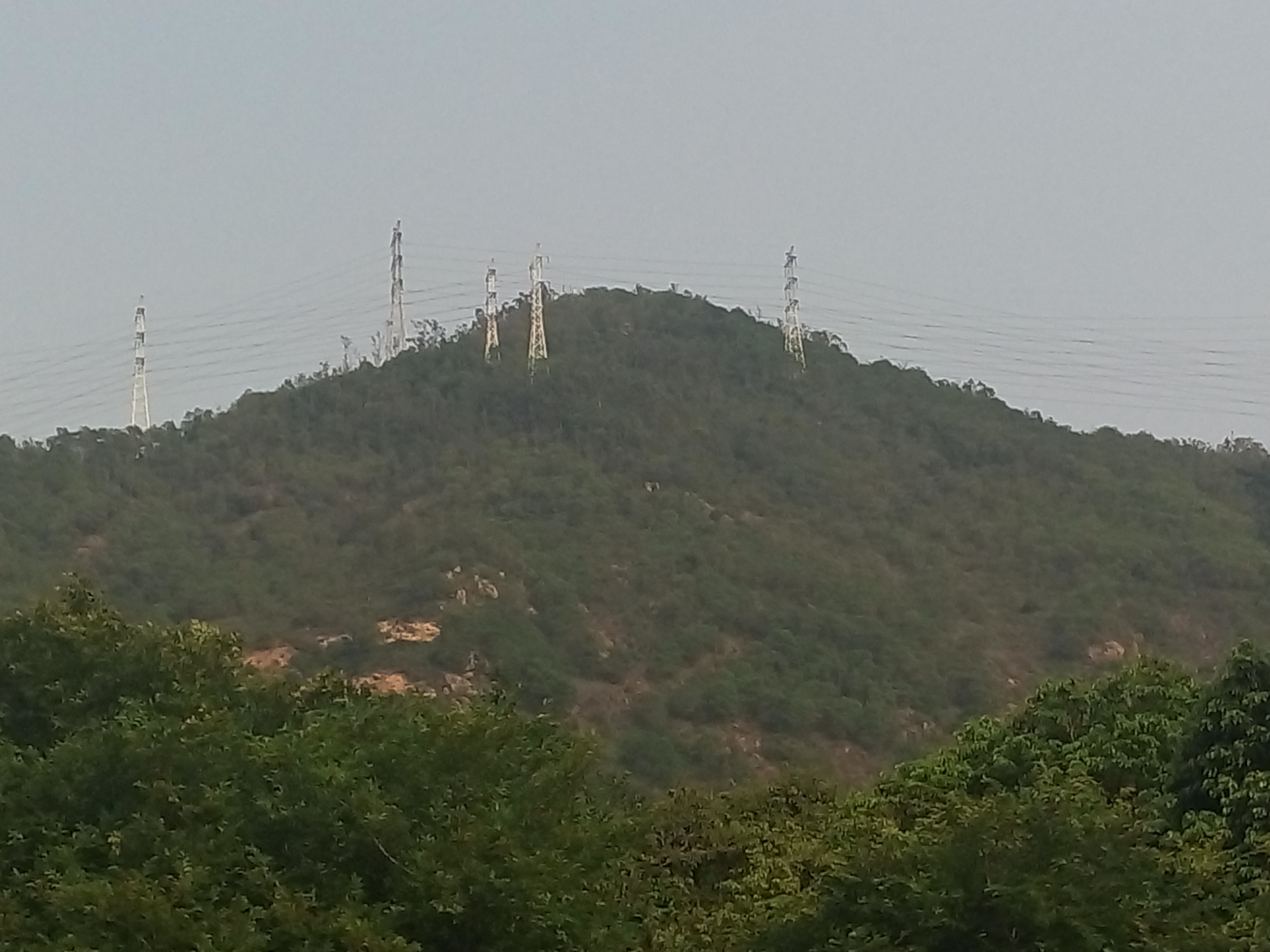
Dananshan

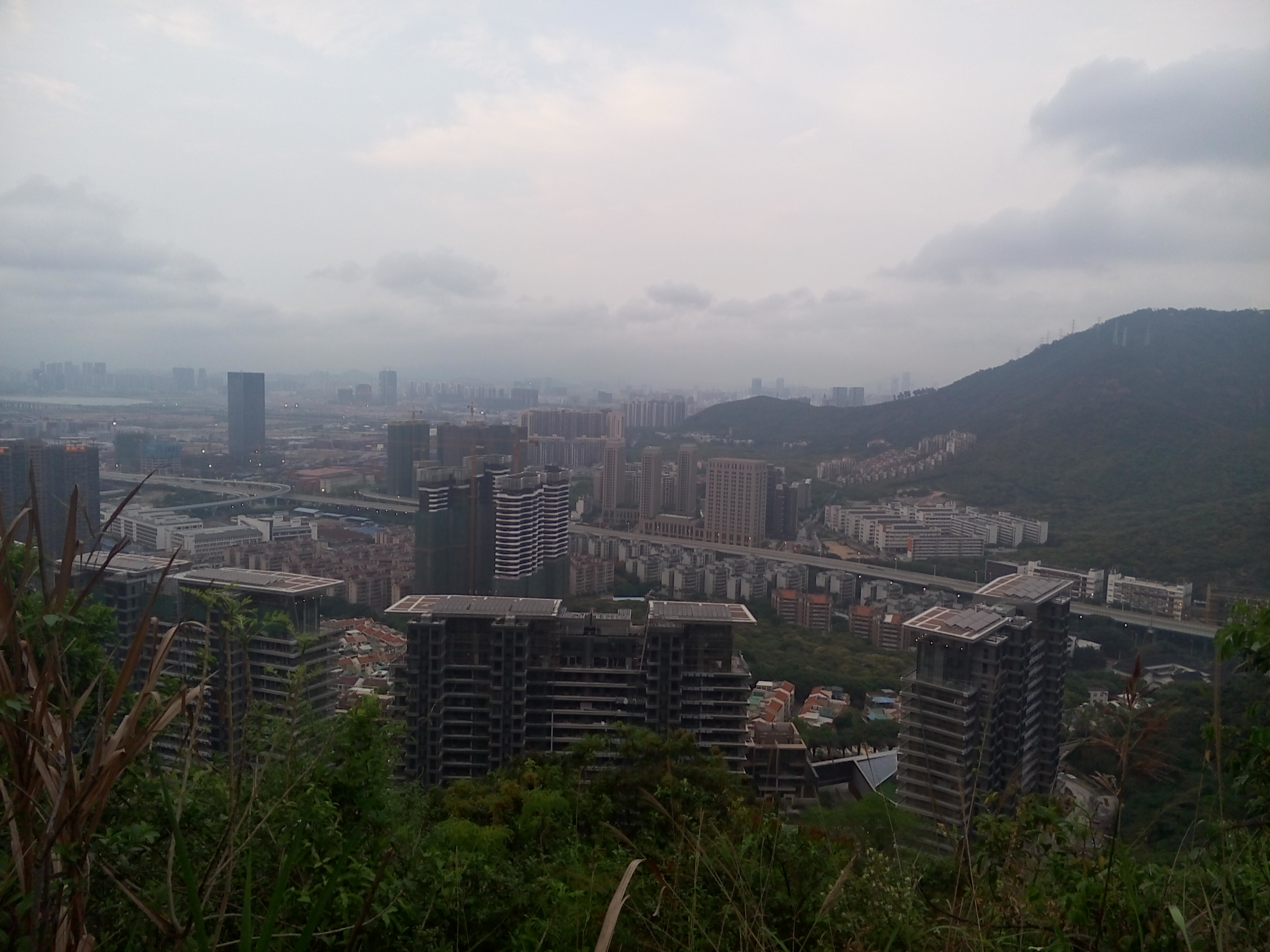
Qianhai and Dananshan (right) as viewed from Xiaonanshan

The Nanshan Mountains or Nanshan are a set of mountains in Shenzhen. The largest of them are the 336-meter (1,102 ft) Dananshan (大南山) and the 150-meter (490 ft) Xiaonanshan (小南山). They are located at the southern tip of Nanshan District, itself named after the mountains. With the Nanshan urban core at its north, Qianhai at its west and Shekou at its southeast, it is amongst the only greenery spaces in the southern half of the district. From the top of Dananshan views can reach west to Nei Lingding Island, east to Futian Central Business District and south to Yuen Long, Hong Kong across Shenzhen Bay.

== See also ==
- Wutongshan
- Qiniangshan
- List of parks in Shenzhen
