= Shenzhen Bay Park =

Public park in Shenzhen, China

Coordinates: 22.5245°N 113.9881°E

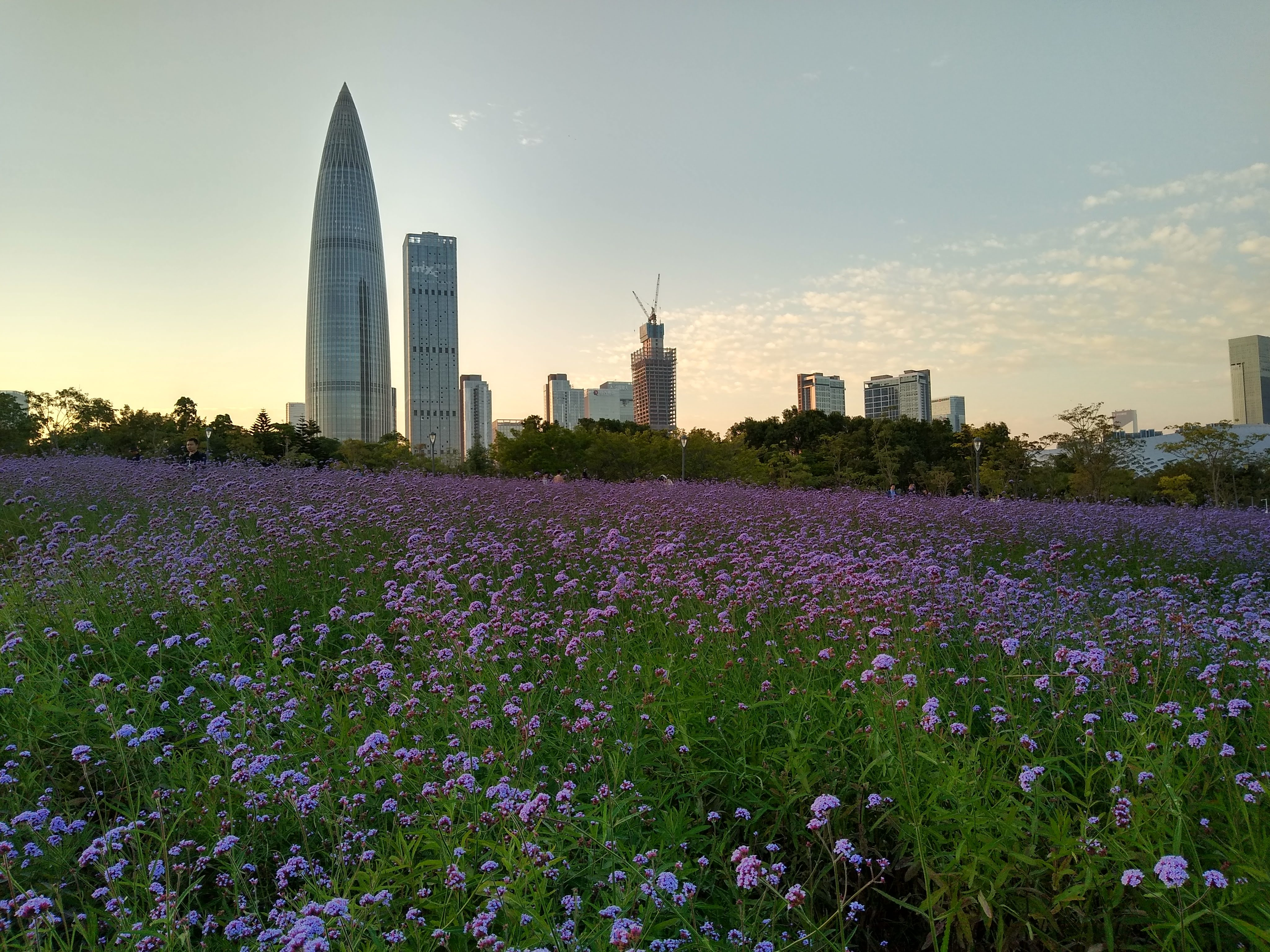
- Shenzhen Bay Park
- Interactive map of Shenzhen Bay Park
- Type: Urban Park
- Location: Shenzhen, Guangdong, China
- Area: 267.0518 acres (108.0720 ha; 0.4172684 mi^{2}; 1.080720 km^{2})
- Visitors: about 12 million annually
- Open: 6:00 a.m. to 11:00 p.m.
- Public transit: Subway and bus
- Shenzhen Bay Park

Shenzhen Bay Park (Chinese: 深圳湾公园) is a seaside urban park spans much of the coastline of Nanshan and Futian districts in Shenzhen, China. Covering an area of 108.07 hectares (267.0518 acres), it is one the most visited urban park in Shenzhen, with an estimated 12 million visitors annually since first opening in 2011.

Shenzhen Bay park consists of two parts, namely The Shenzhen Bay Coastal Leisure Zone (Chinese: 深圳湾滨海休闲带) at its South West side and Shenzhen Mangrove Coastal Eco-Park (Chinese: 红树林海滨生态公园) at its Eastern side. The latter is situated within the Shenzhen Mangrove Nature Reserve, a habitat of numerous endangered bird species and is also known for its mangrove.

The entire area of the park opened on August 6, 2011, the day before the 2011 Summer Universiade that took place in Shenzhen.

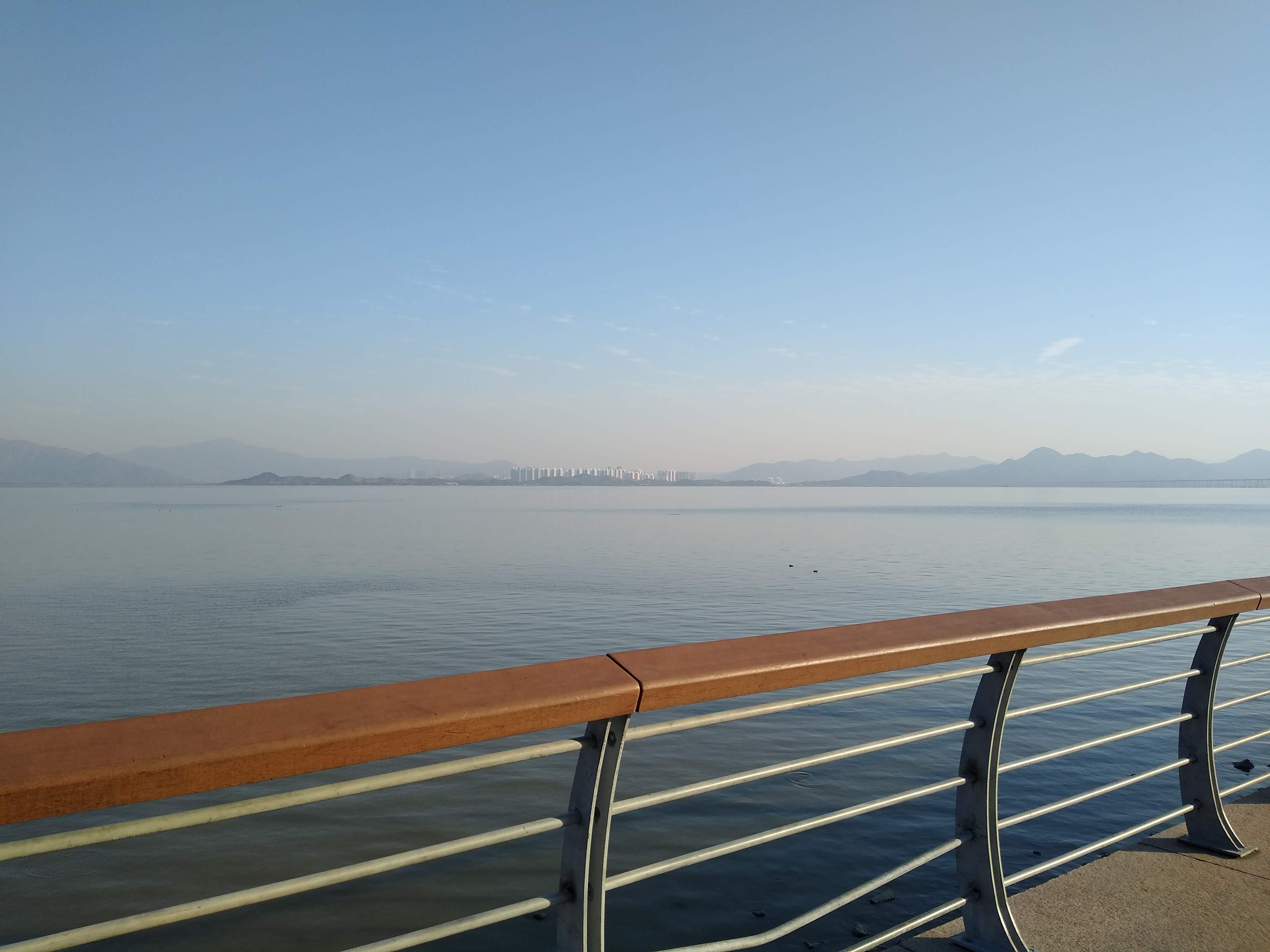
View of Shenzhen Bay from the park

This two parts are divided into more than 10 different theme areas, including Zhongwan Yuehai Plaza (Chinese: 中湾阅海广场), Haiyun Garden (Chinese: 海韵园), egret hillside (Chinese: 白鹭坡), Beiwanlu harbour (Chinese: 北湾鹭港), Xiaosha Hill (Chinese: 小沙山), Universiade Torch Tower (Chinese: 大运火炬塔), Liuhua hill (Chinese: 流花山), Crescent Valley (Chinese: 弯月山谷), Sunrise Theater (Chinese: 日出剧场), Tidal Wetland (Chinese: 潮汐湿地), Wedding Plaza (Chinese: 婚庆广场), Sea Viewing Pier (Chinese: 观海栈桥), Sea Breeze Sports square (Chinese: 海风运动广场) and so on. Among them, the Universiade Torch Tower is 26 meters high and became a new city landmark after Shenzhen hosted the 2011 Summer Universiade.

Shenzhen is an important places for migrant birds from Siberia to Australia, which make Shenzhen Bay Park also become a good place for bird watching - including a lot of nationally protected bird species. The local environment organisations often hold public bird watching activities, provide equipment and bird watching guidance. And the Shenzhen Bay Park Nature Education Centre(Chinese: 深圳湾公园自然教育中心) jointly established by the Shenzhen Urban Management Bureau, the Shenzhen Park Management Center and the Shenzhen Mangrove Wetland Protection Foundation, which is the first nature education centre in China.

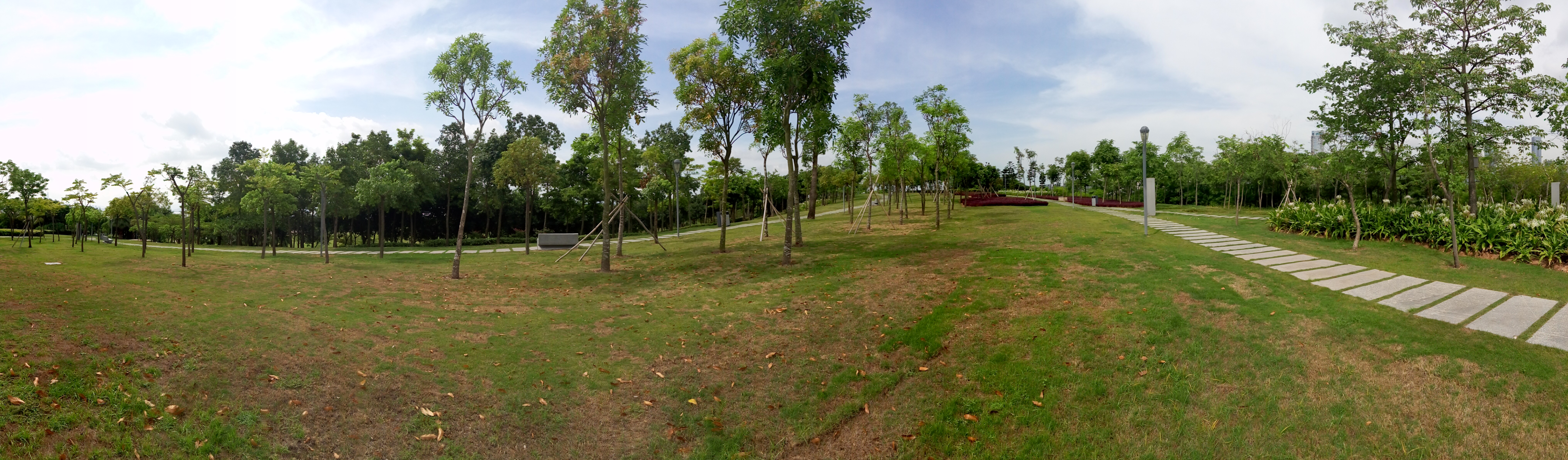
A recreational area of Shenzhen Bay Park

== Description ==
Shenzhen Bay Park occupies a 13-kilometre long stretch of reclaimed land along the southern coast of Shenzhen on the north shore of Shenzhen Bay (Deep Bay), starting west near Shenzhen Bay Bridge at Wanghai road and ending at the Shenzhen Mangrove Nature Reserve. And it runs along much of the length of Binhai and Binhe Boulevards and occupies an area of 108.07 hectares (267.0518 acres).

=== Design and layout ===
The park is designed to divided in 14 theme zones. The park is motor vehicle-free but everything zones are accessible via walking and cycling trails.

== History ==
Shenzhen Bay Park was originally a tidal flat in the northern part of Shenzhen Bay before it was formed by the reclamation for the construction of Binhe Boulevards.

In order to protect the mangroves, the Government moved the originally planned Binhe Boulevards through the mangroves more than 200 meters north, and transformed the reclaimed roadbed to the west into the Shenzhen mangrove coastal eco-park. The mangrove park was founded in 1999, and officially opened to the public in December 2000.

In 2001, it merged with the Shenzhen Bay Coastal Leisure Zone to form the Shenzhen Bay Park. After the construction of Shenzhen Bay Coastal Leisure Zone which was founded in 2006, Shenzhen Bay Park finally officially opened to the public on August 5, 2011.

== See also ==
- Shenzhen Bay Park station
- List of parks in Shenzhen
