= Binhai Boulevard =

Road in Shenzhen, China

- Binhai Road
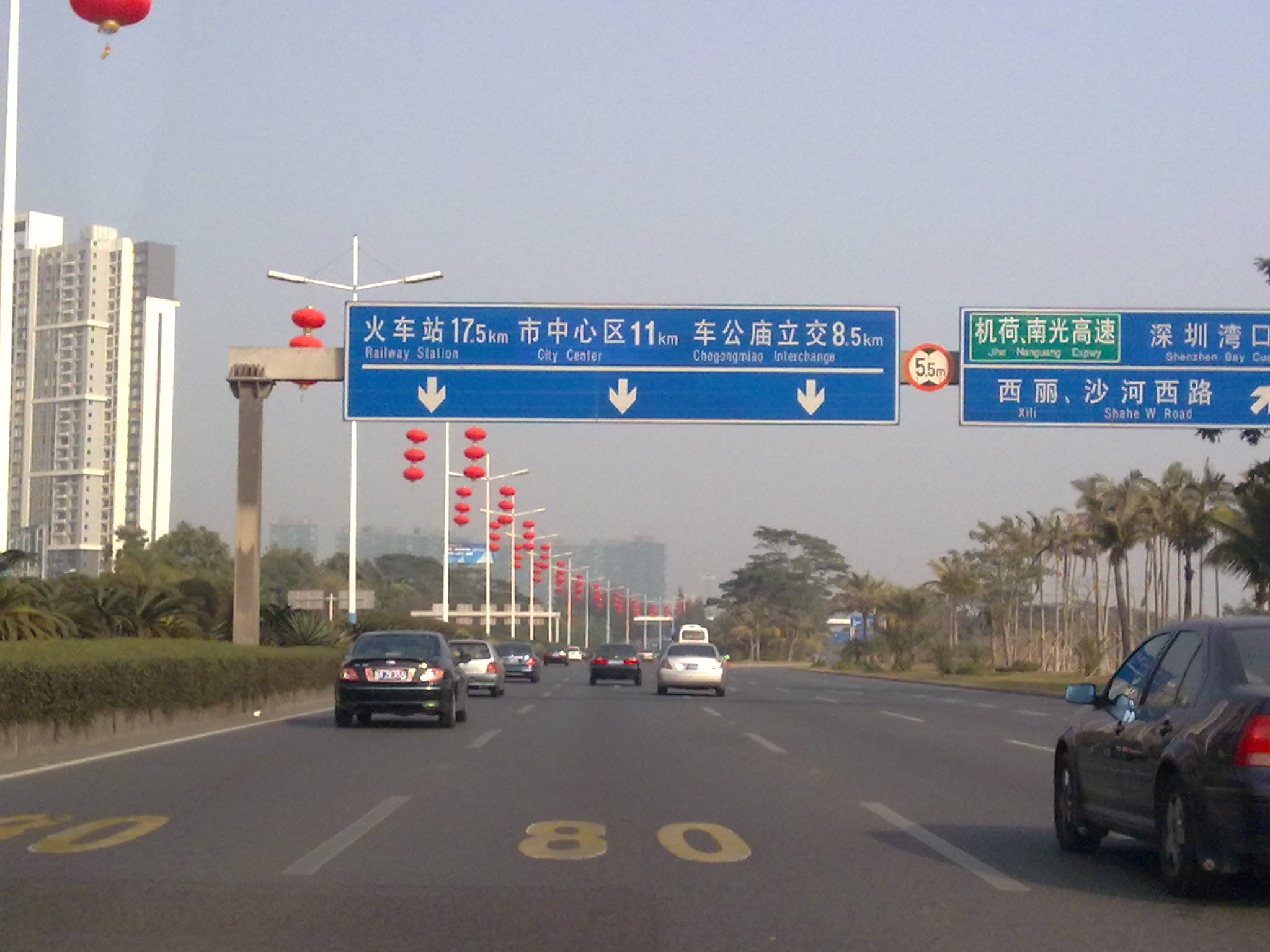
- Binhai Boulevard
- Native name: 滨海大道 (Chinese)
- Namesake: Proximity to the sea
- Length: 9,655.24 m (31,677.3 ft)
- Width: 4 lanes of traffic on either side
- West end: Guimiao Road / Nanshan Boulevard
- East end: Binhe Road

Construction
- Completion: 1999

Other
- Status: Complete

Binhai Boulevard (Chinese: 滨海大道) is a major expressway in Shenzhen, China. It runs from Nanshan Boulevard in Nanshan and runs along much of the length of Shenzhen Bay Park and eventually joins Binhe Road when it ends at Futian. Over 7 kilometres (4.3 mi) of the road was built on land reclaimed from Shenzhen Bay. It is the southernmost major road in Shenzhen.

== Notable sites along the road ==
- Shenzhen Bay Park
- OCT Bay

== Gallery ==
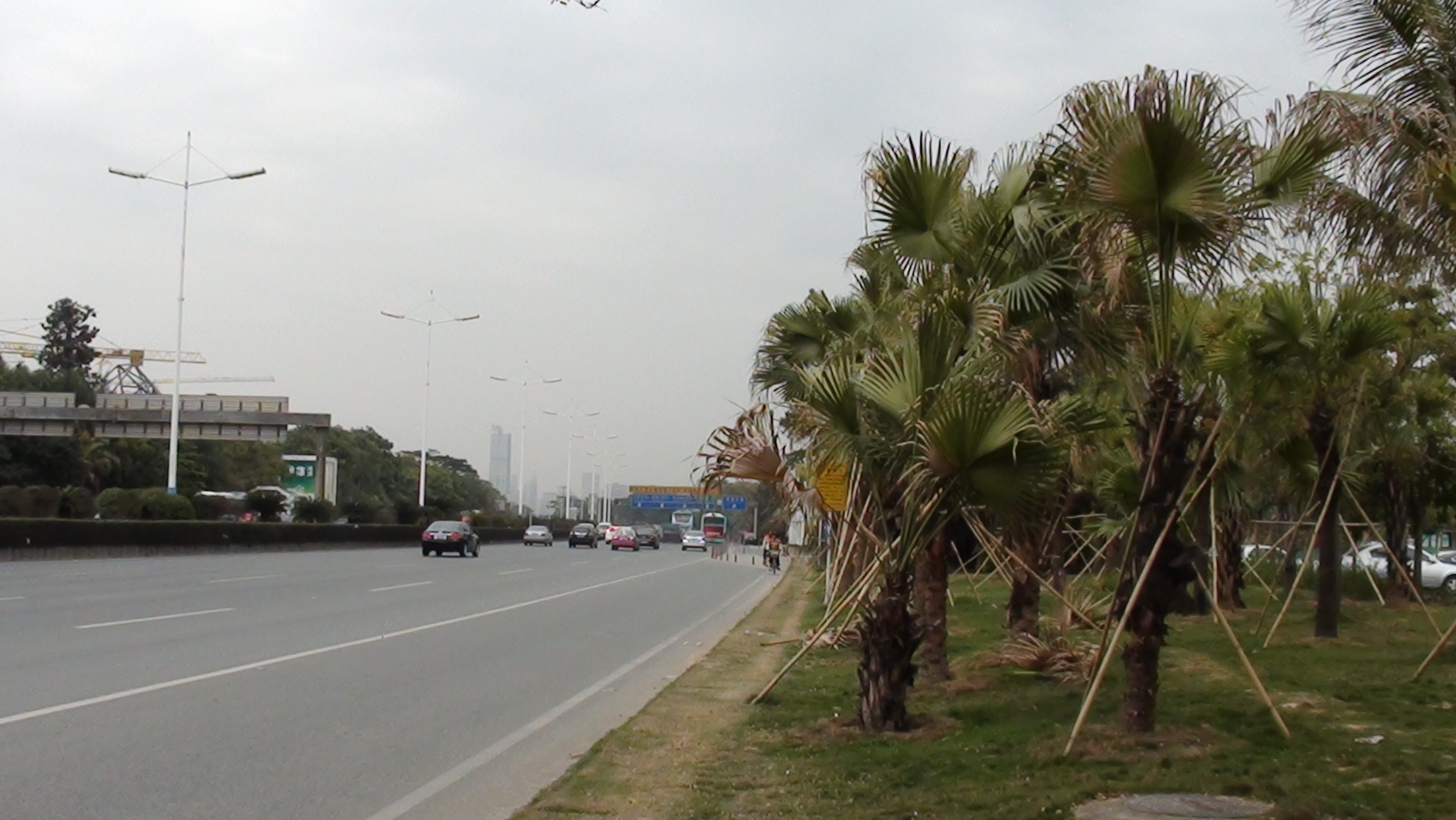

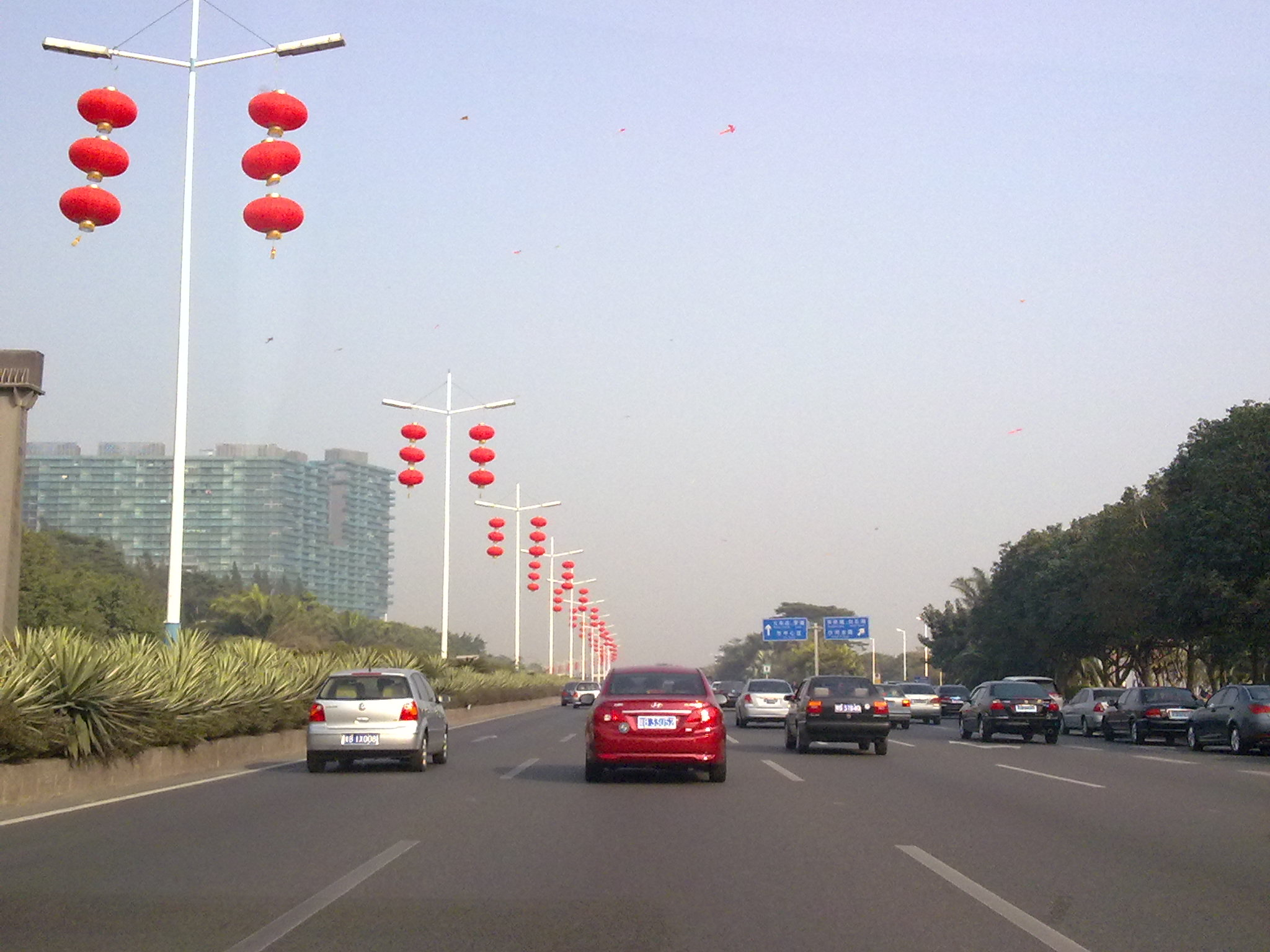

== See also ==
- Shennan Road
- Beihuan Boulevard
