= Shennan Road =

Road in Shenzhen, China

- Shennan Boulevard, Shennan Dadao
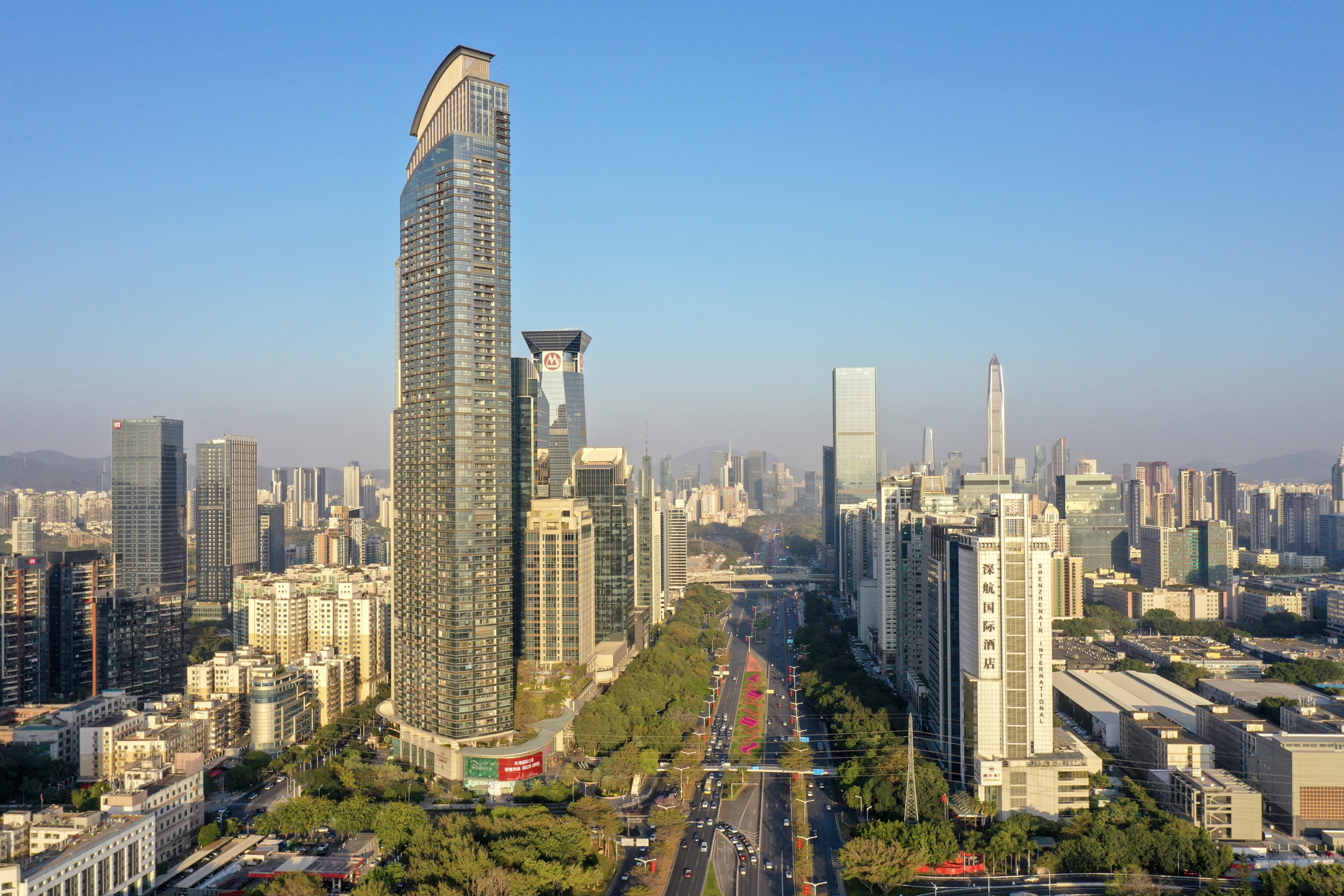
- Shennan Road Over Zhuzilin Junction in 2021
- Native name: 深南路 (Chinese); 深南大道 (Chinese)
- Length: 25.6 km (15.9 mi)

Other
- Status: Complete

Shennan Road (Chinese: 深南路; pinyin: Shēnnán Lù) is a major east-west thoroughfare of Shenzhen, China.

== Location ==
Spanning all over Luohu, Futian and Nanshan Districts, the road measures 25.6 km (15.9 mi) in length. It is divided into three sections, namely Shennan Boulevard (Chinese: 深南大道; pinyin: Shēnnán Dàdào; Jyutping: Sam1 naam4 Daai6 dou6), Shennan Middle Road (深南中路) and Shennan East Road (深南东路). The sections defined as the portions of Nantou Checkpoint to Huanggang Road, Huanggang Road to Hongling Road and Hongling to Yanhe Road respectively. The two-way road mostly consists of 4 lanes of traffic on each side (around 135m in width, the widest section for up to 350m). In some sections there are side roads and greening present.

== History ==
The road is named after the two former settlements (of which both would later be integrated as part of the city of Shenzhen) it links on each end, the towns of Shenzhen (深圳镇) in Luohu and Nantou (南头镇) in Nanshan, and is known for its presence of skyscrapers flanking along its sides. However, prior to the designation of Shenzhen as a city in 1979, the road was but a 2.1 km (1.3 mi) long gravel path only 7 m (23 ft) wide linking Shenzhen and Shangbu planning area. The road was then laid with asphalt, continued by numerous extensions and widenings, and became fully built c.1994.

== Attractions ==
Attractions along the road include Window of the World, Happy Valley, Huaqiangbei, Dongmen and Shun Hing Square.

== Gallery ==
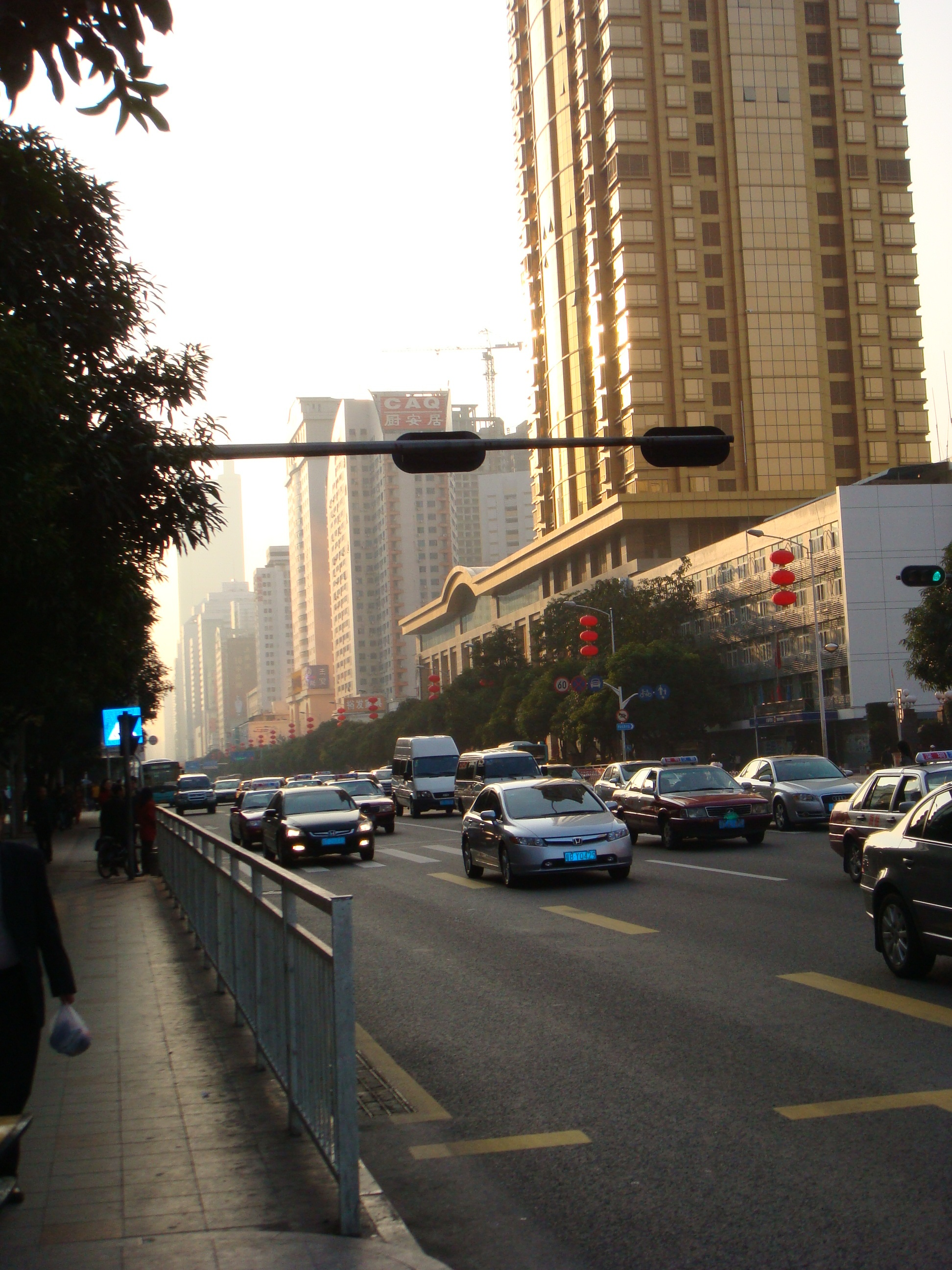
Shennan East Road.

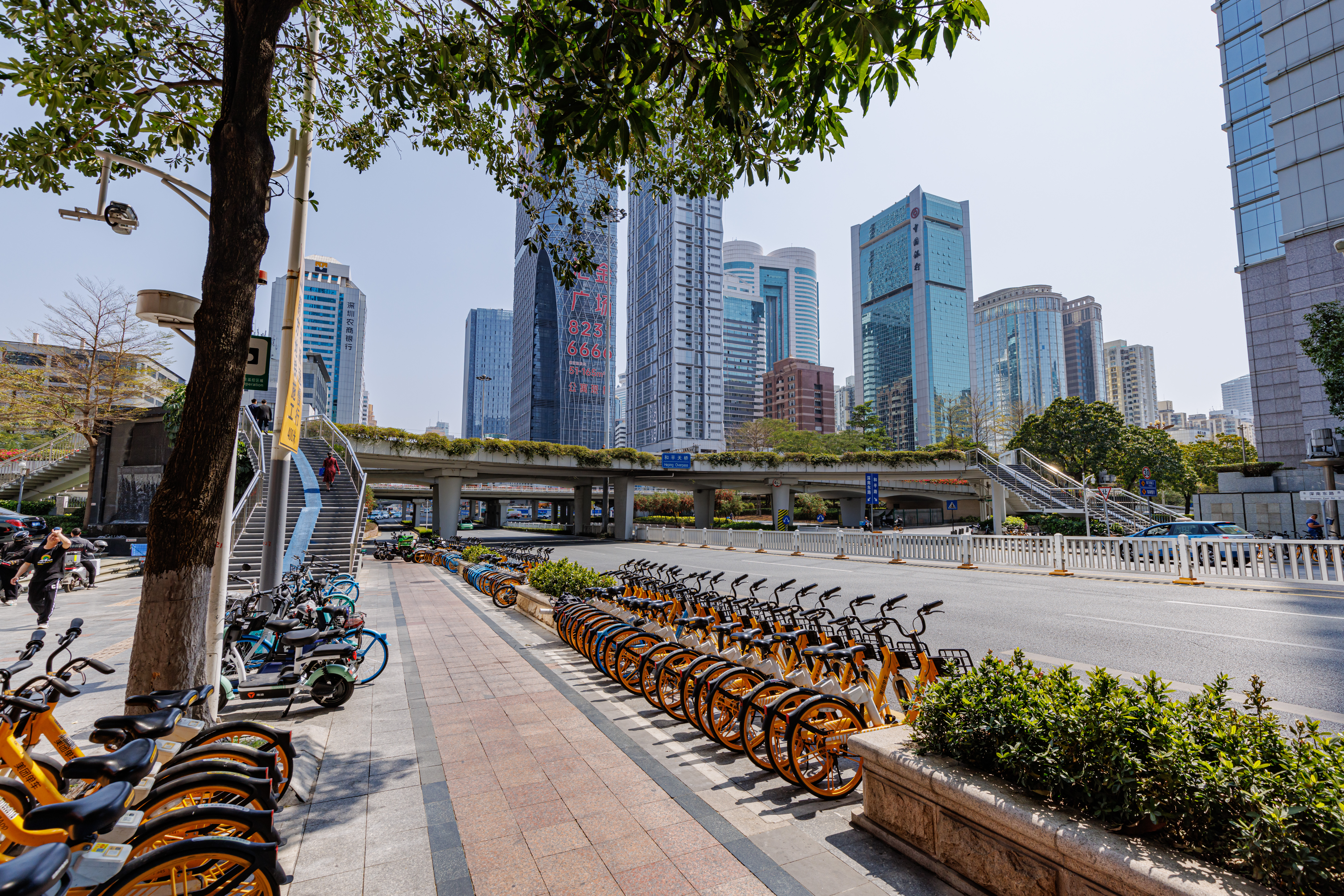
Shennan East Road.

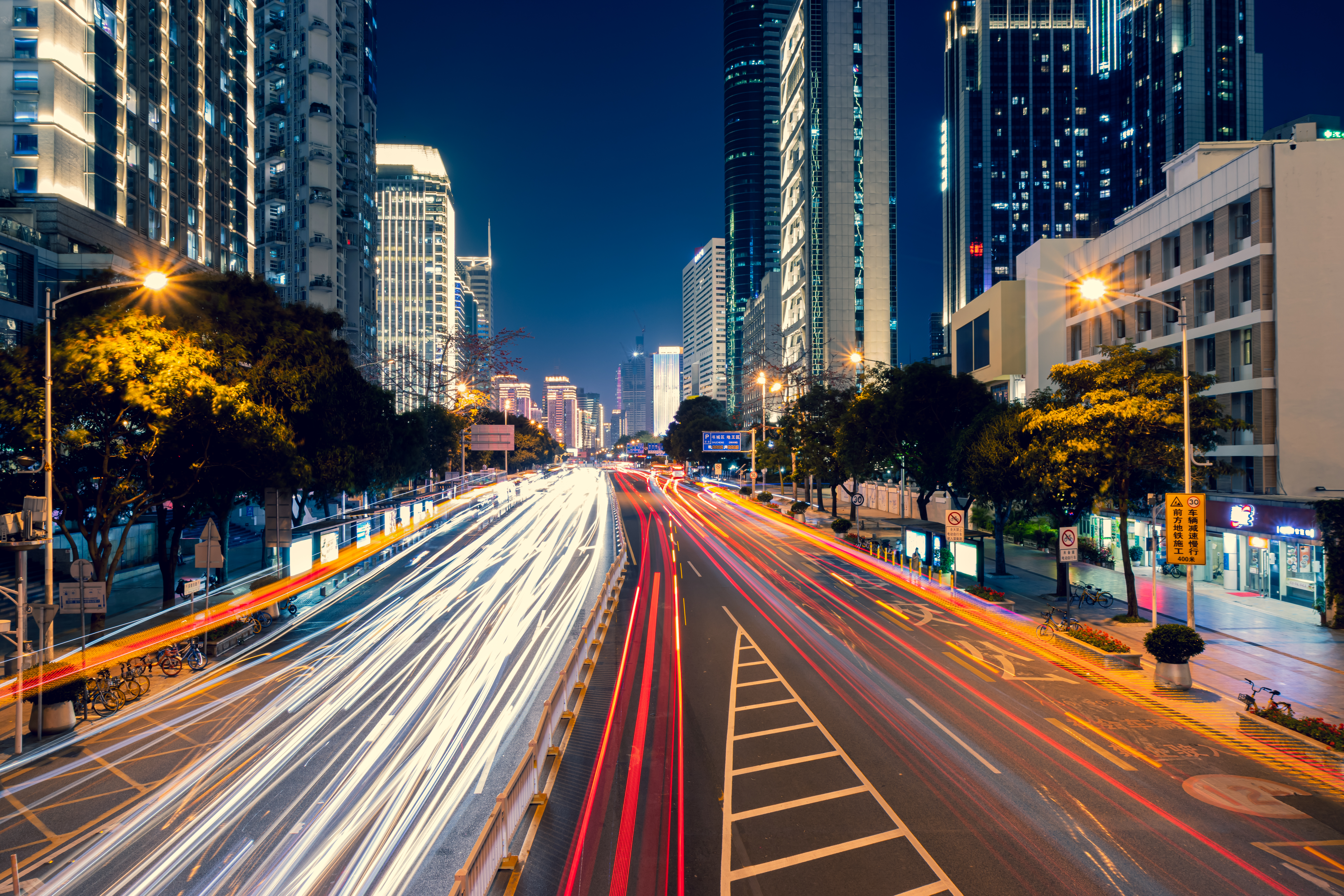
Shennan East Road at night.

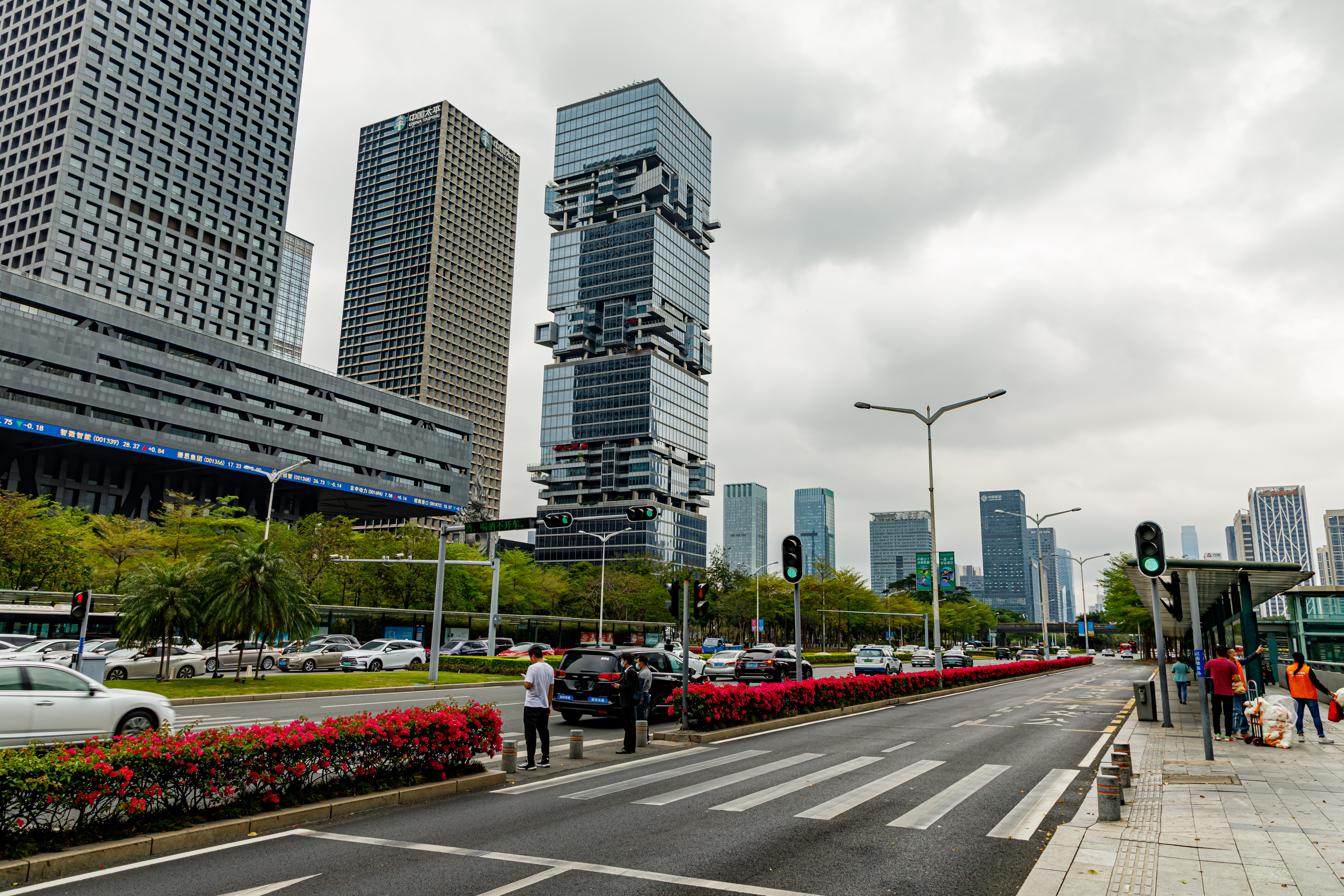
Shennan Boulevard.

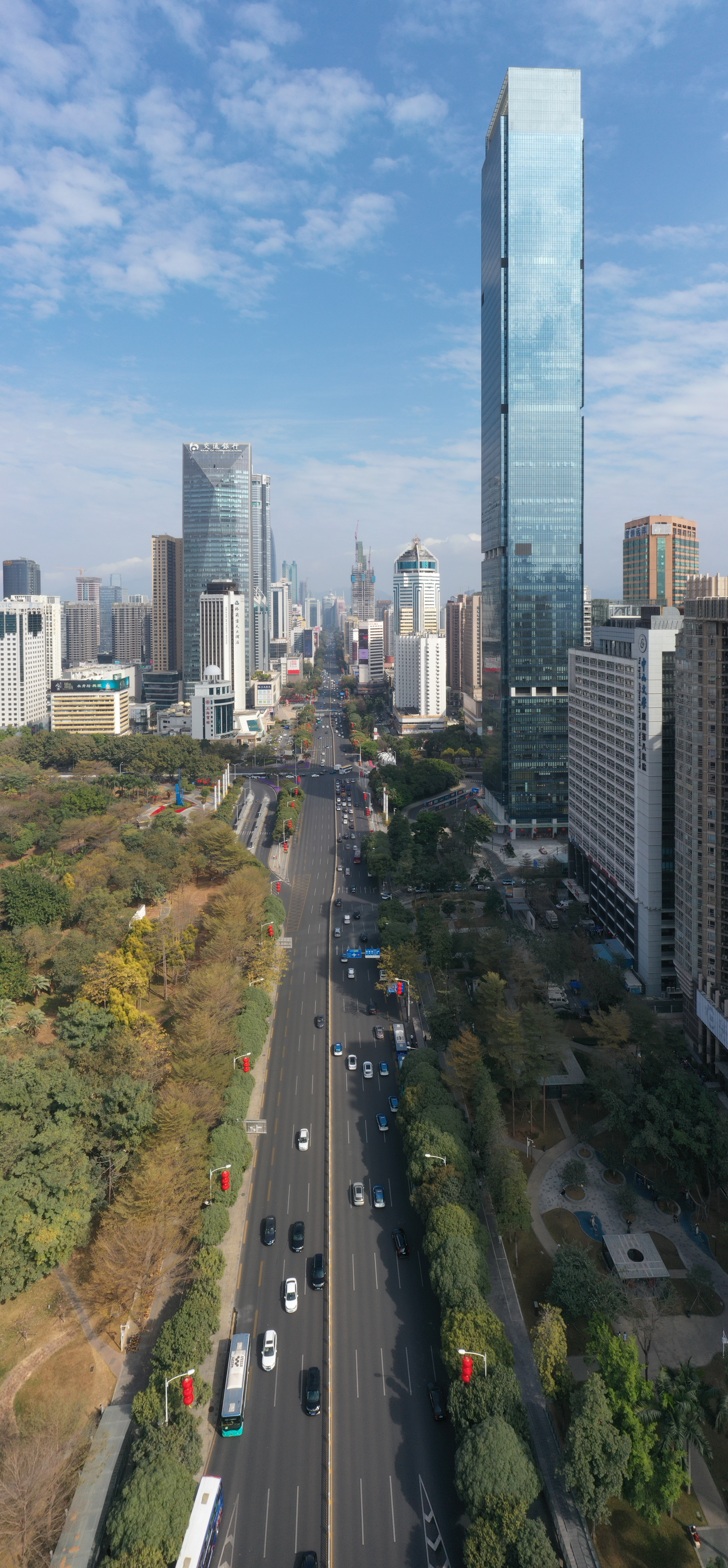
Shennan Middle Road.

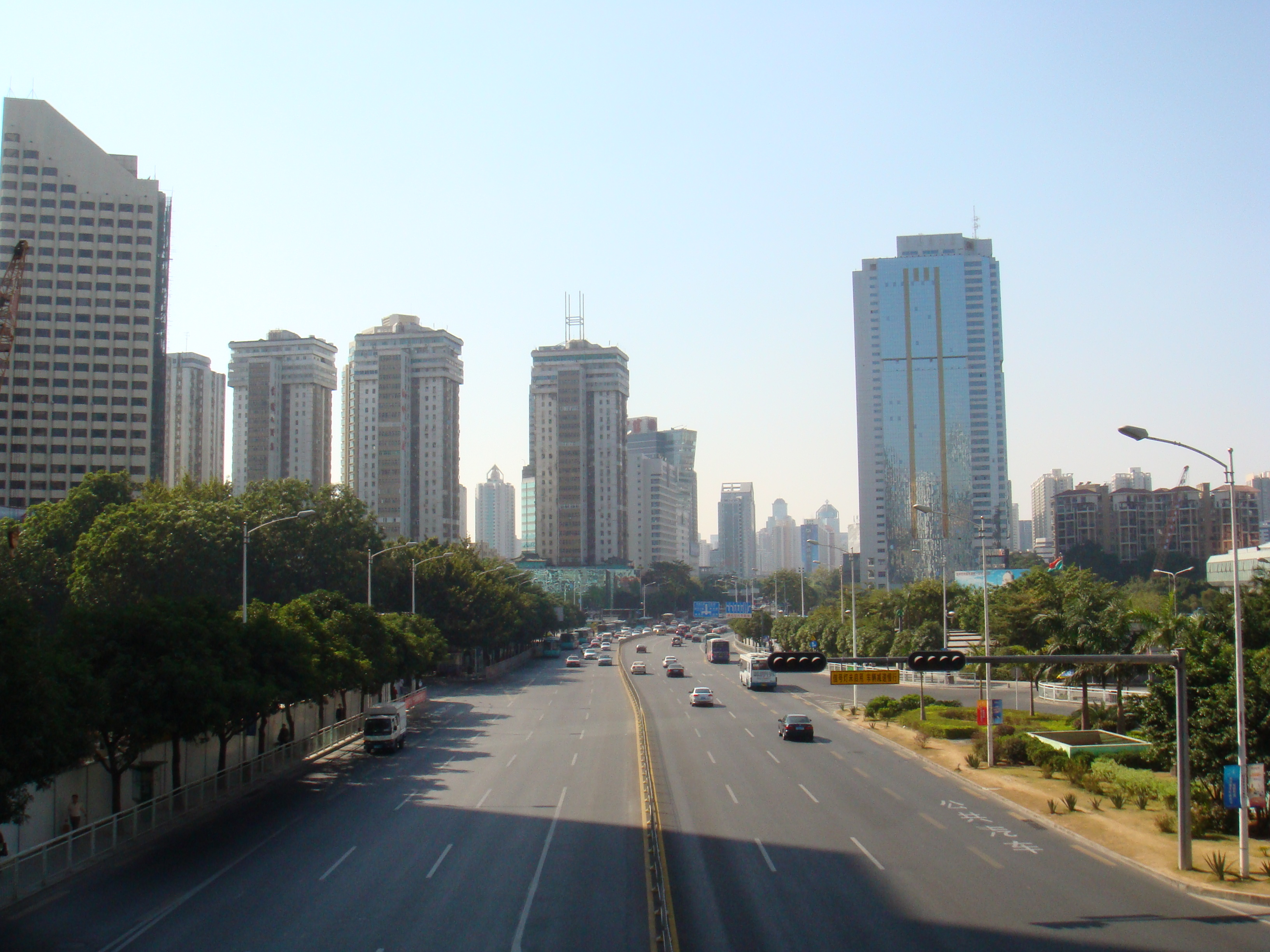
Junction of Shennan East and Middle Roads.

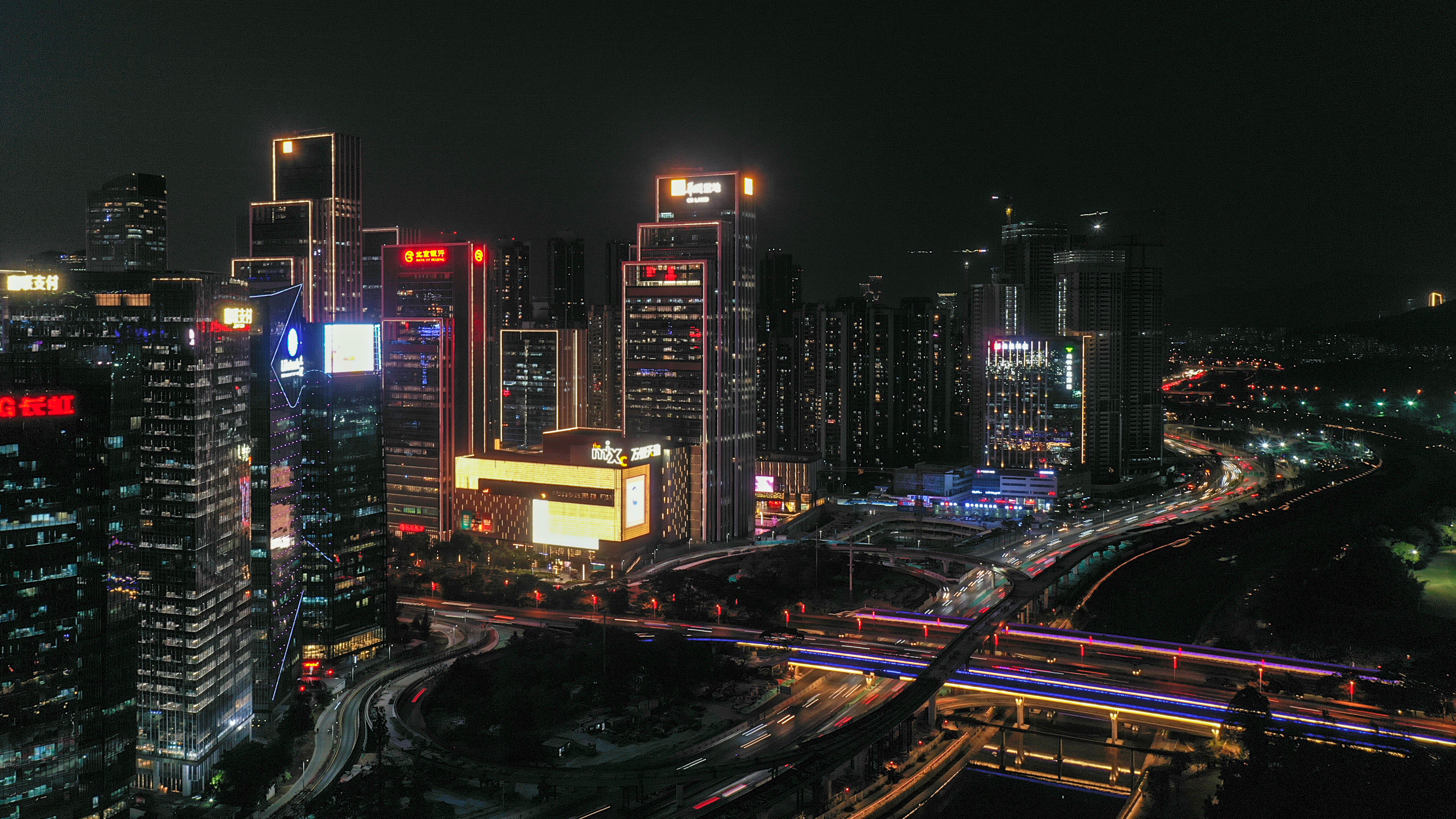
Junction of Shennan & Shahe Roads in Nanshan.

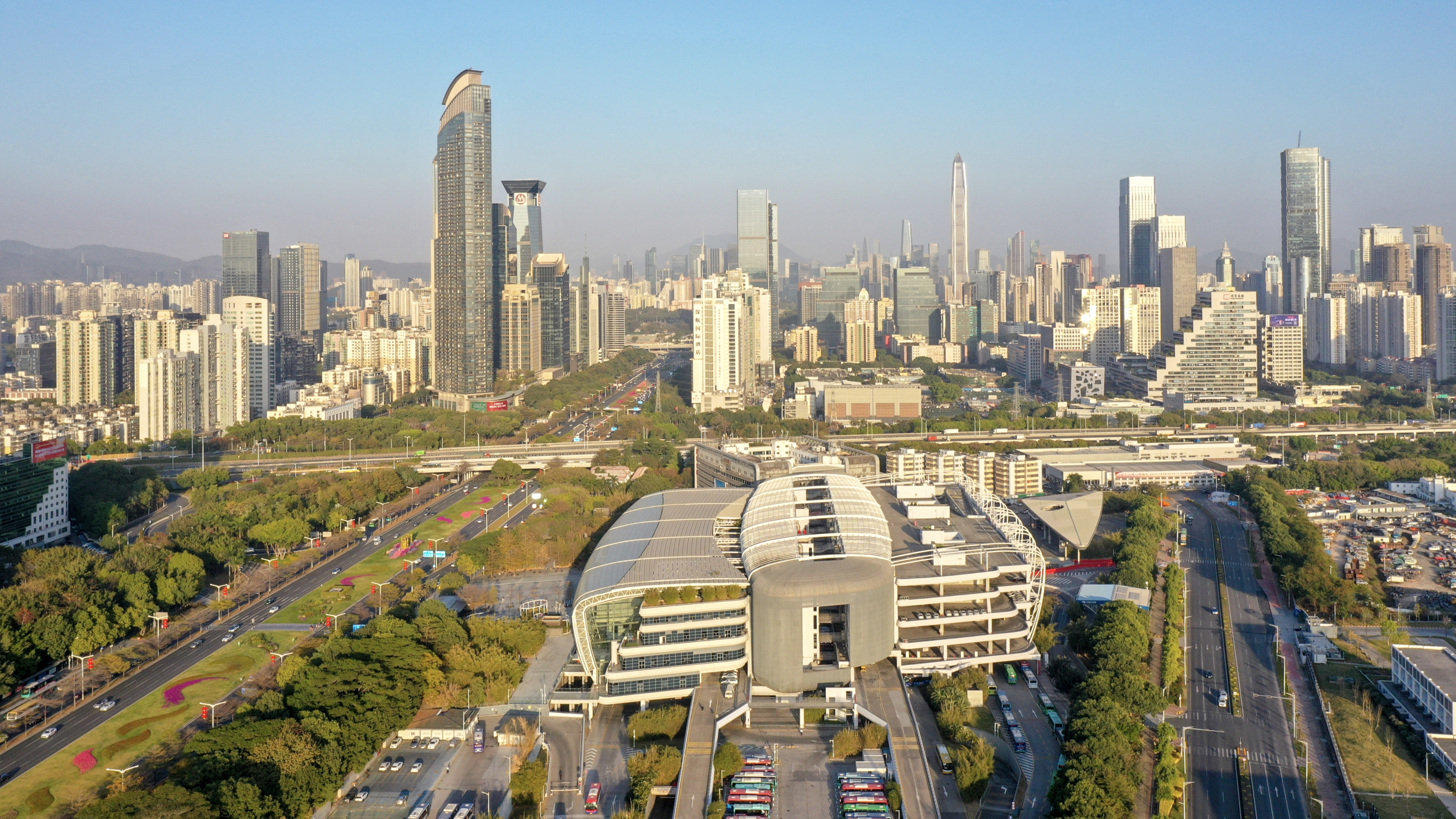
Shennan Road & G4 Beijing–Hong Kong and Macau Expressway in Futian.

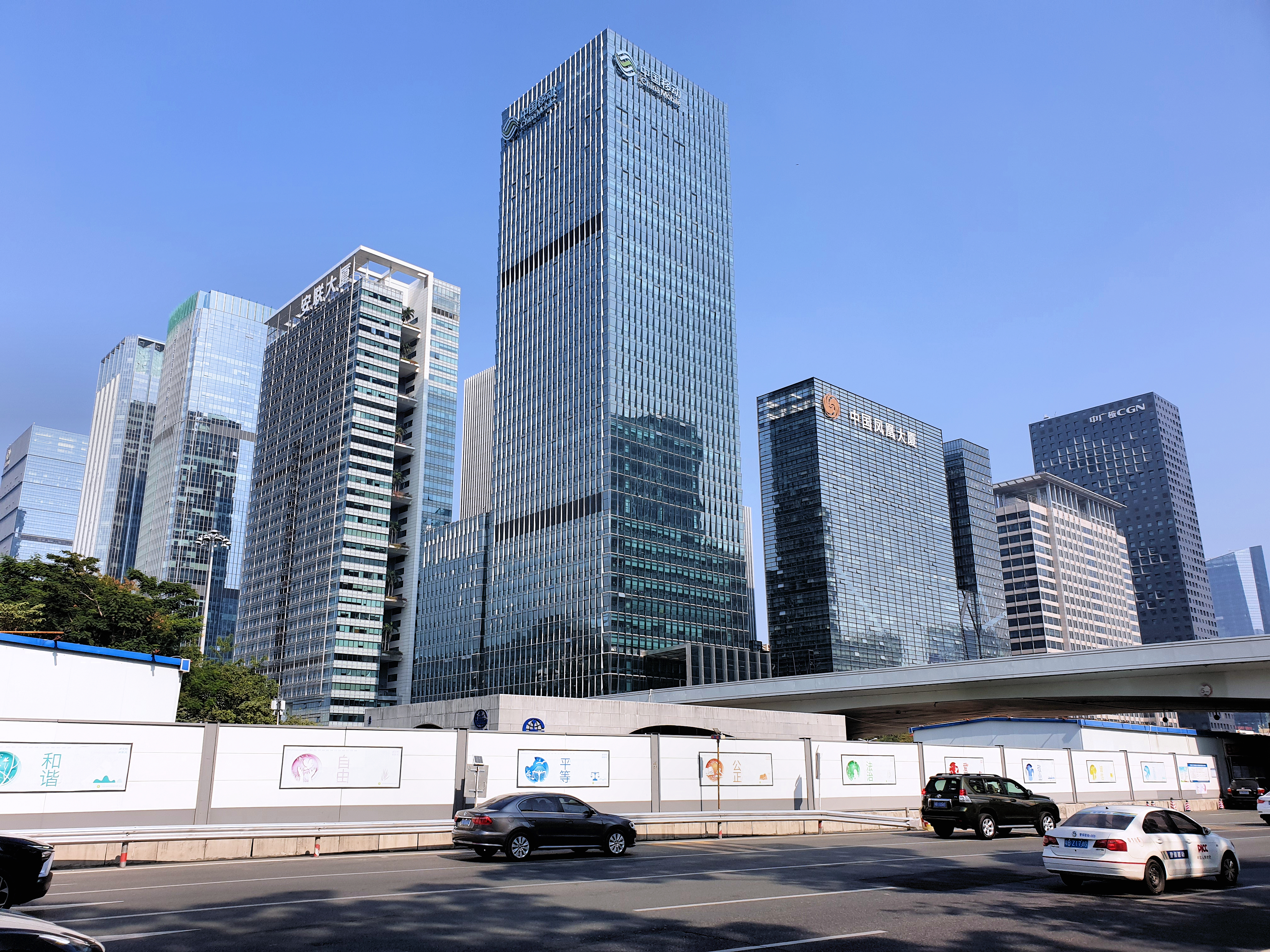
Office Buildings in Shenzhen Road.

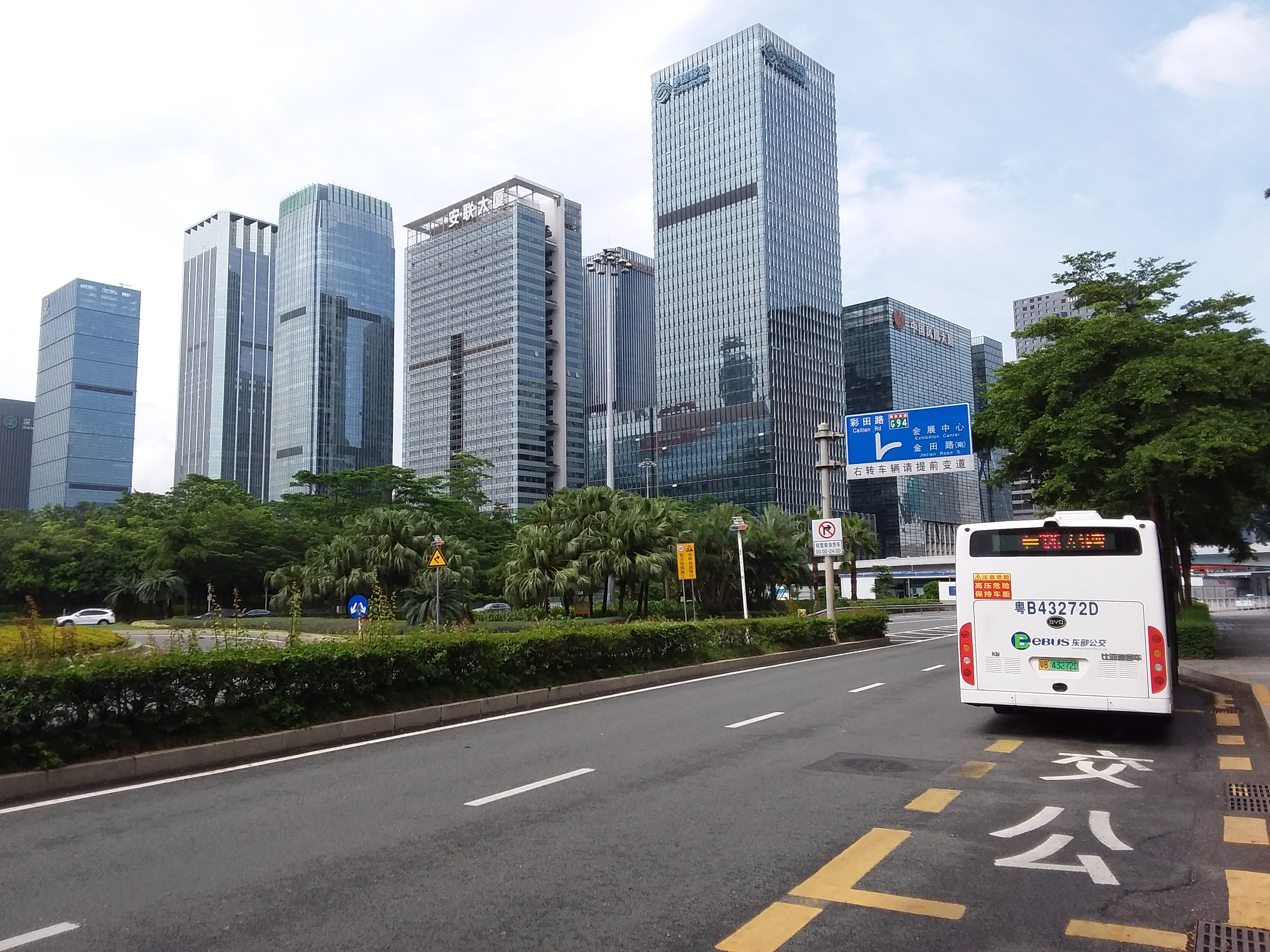
Shennan Boulevard.

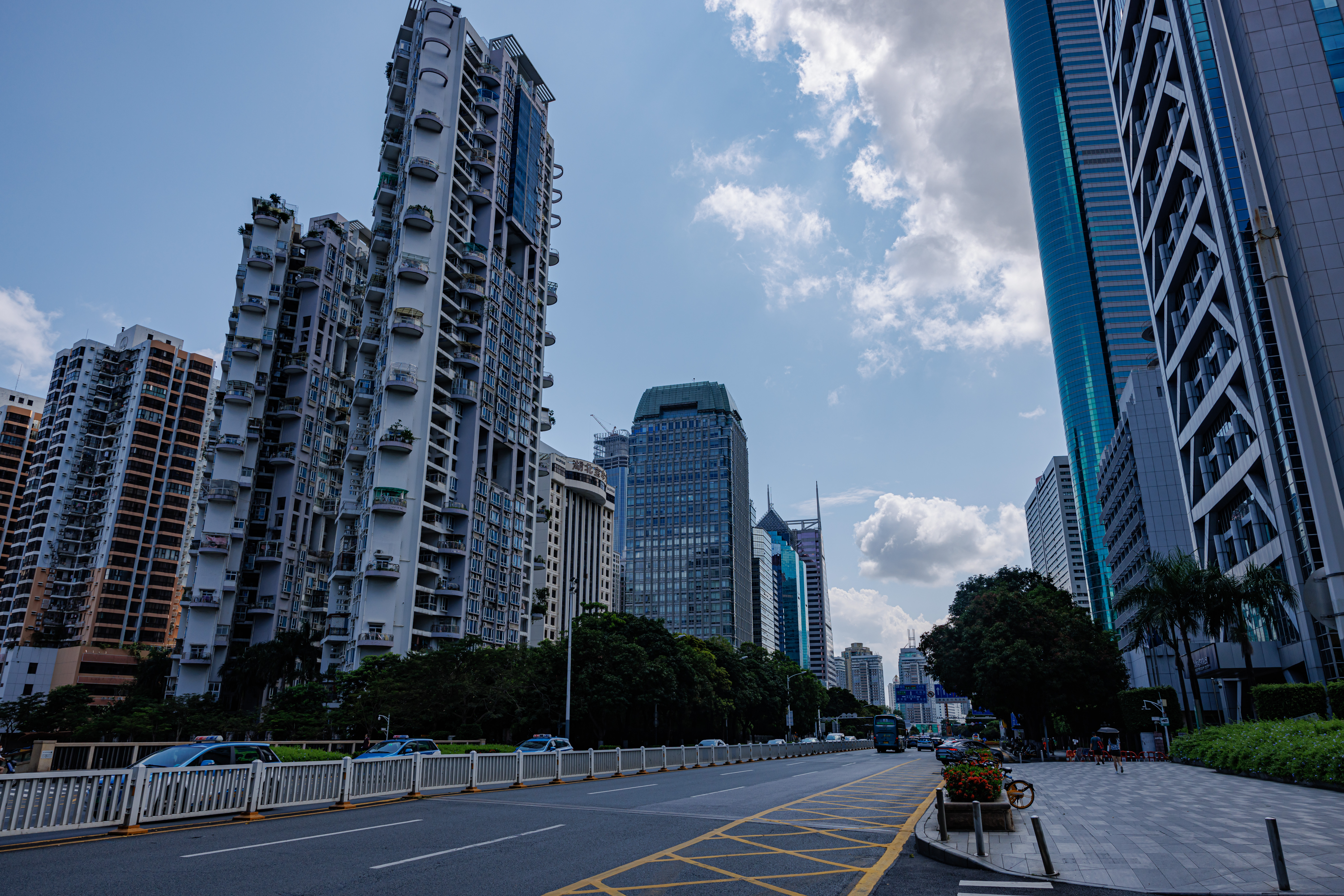
Shennan East Road.

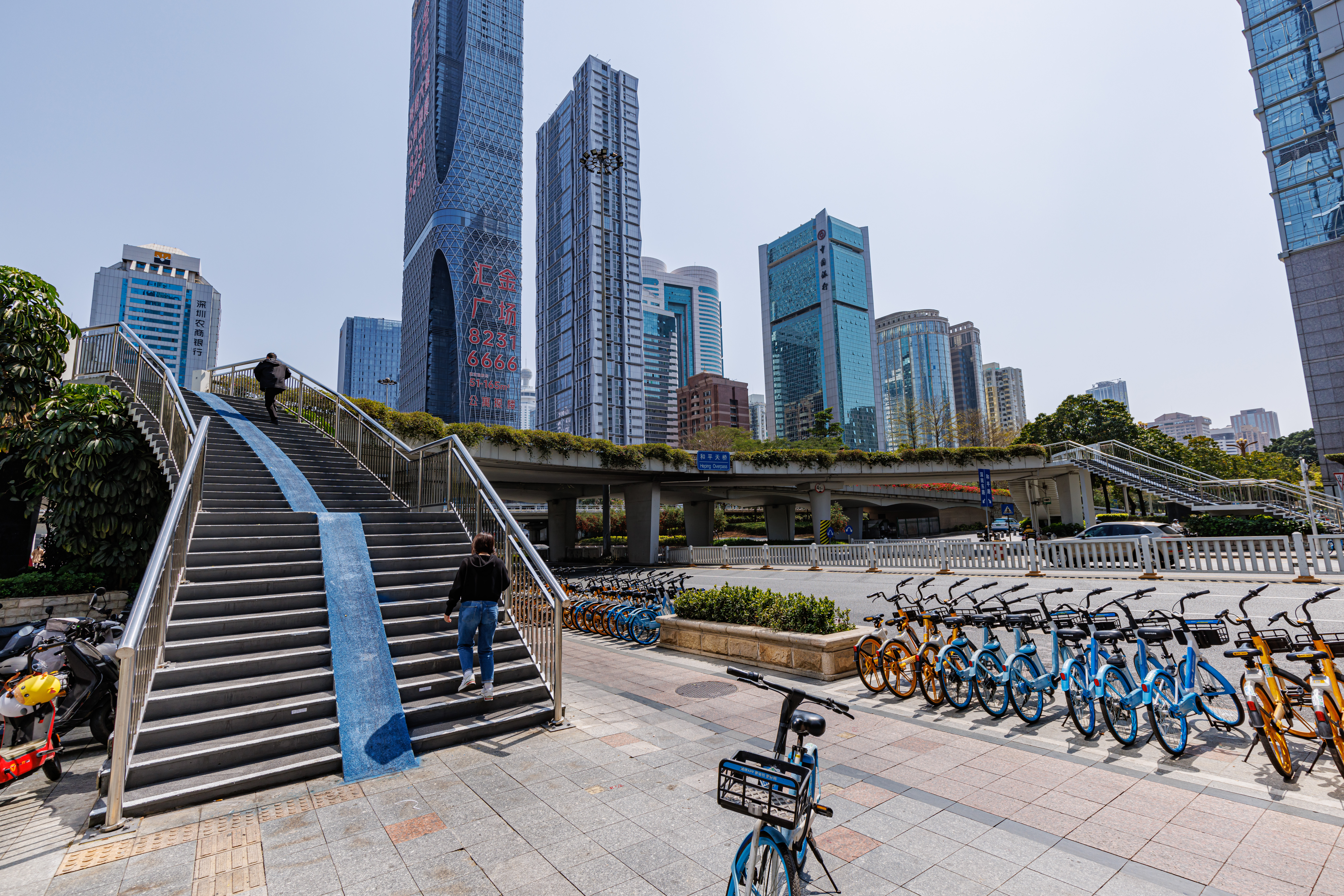
Pedestrial crossing in Shennan Road.

== See also ==
- Binhai Boulevard
- Beihuan Boulevard
