= Beihuan Boulevard =

Road in Shenzhen, China

- Beihuan Dadao
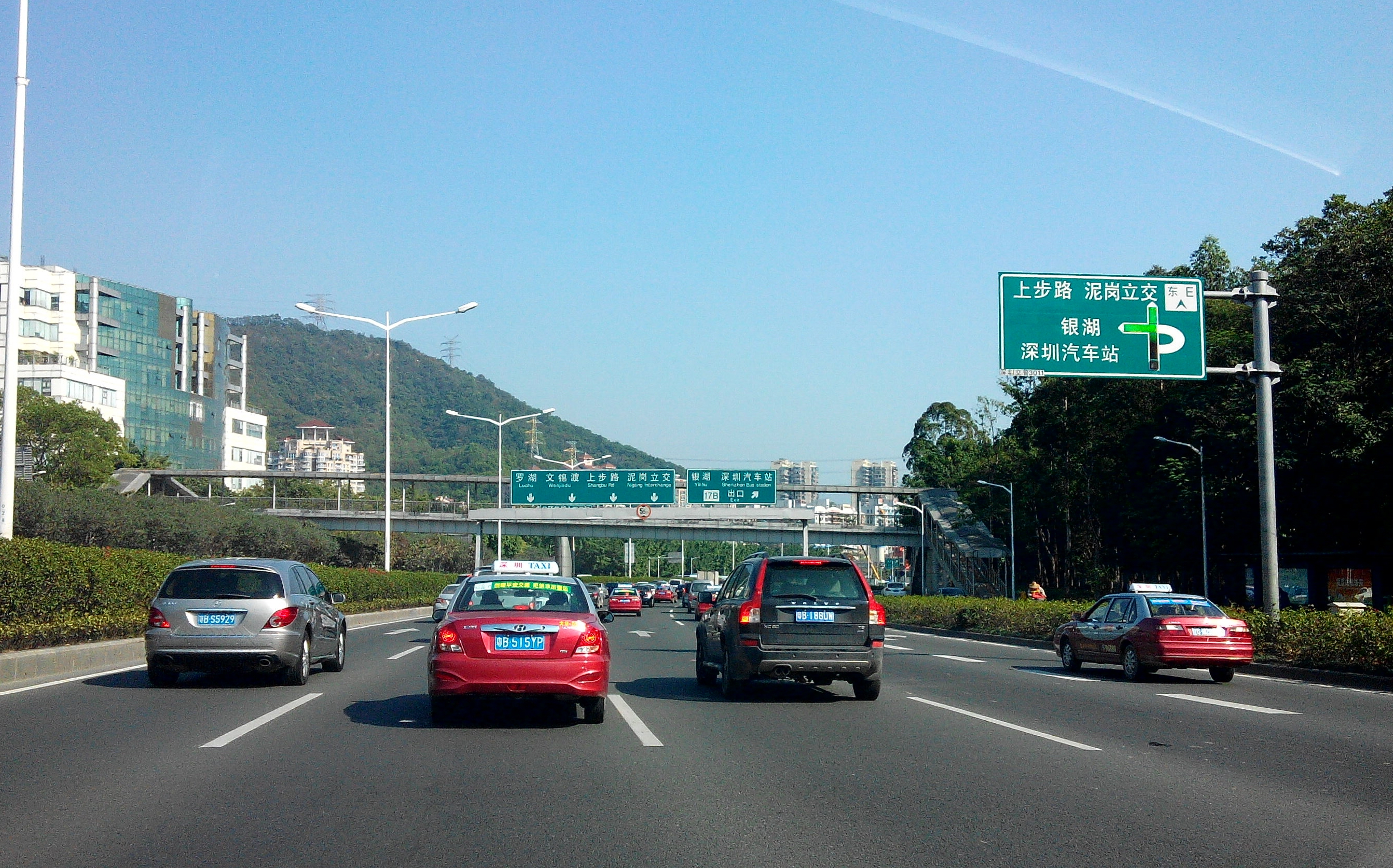
- Beihuan Boulevard
- Native name: 北环大道 (Chinese)
- Namesake: "Northern Ring Road"
- Length: 12.1 mi (19.5 km)
- Width: 4 lanes of traffic on either side
- Area: Nanshan District/Futian District
- Location: Shenzhen, China
- East: Shangbu Road / Nigang Road
- West: Yueliang Bay Blvd / Shennan Blvd / Baoan Blvd / G107

Construction
- Completion: 1992 (Renovated in 2011)

Other
- Status: Complete

Beihuan Boulevard
- Simplified Chinese: 北环大道
- Traditional Chinese: 北環大道
Transcriptions
Standard Mandarin
- Hanyu Pinyin: Běi Huán Dàdào
Yue: Cantonese
- Jyutping: bak1 waan4 daai6 dou6

Beihuan Boulevard (Chinese: 北环大道) is a major expressway in Shenzhen, China. It runs from Yueliangwan Boulevard in Nanshan and ends at Shangbu, Futian. Spanning 19.5 kilometres (12.1 mi), it is among the longest roads in the city.

== See also ==
- Shennan Road
- Binhai Boulevard
