= Qianhai =

Qianhai 前海深港现代服务业合作区
- Modern Service Industry Cooperation Zone
- Qianhai Shenzhen-Hong Kong Modern Service Industry Cooperation Zone
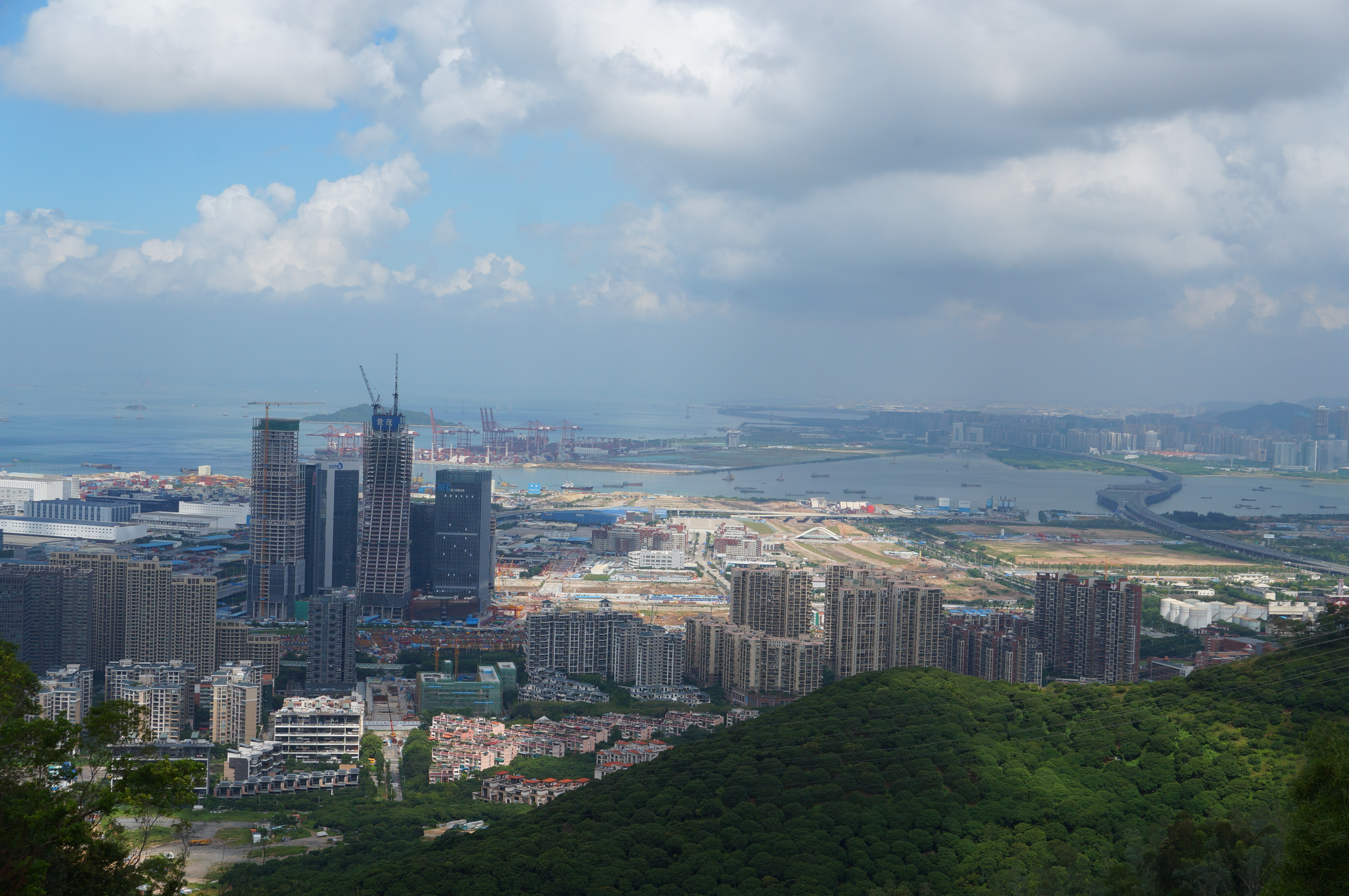

- Location in Guangdong Qianhai (Guangdong)
- Coordinates: 22°31′00″N 113°54′02″E
- Country: People's Republic of China
- Province: Guangdong
- Prefecture-level city: Shenzhen
- District: Nanshan

Government
  - Director: Zhang Bei (张备)

Area
  - Total: 14.92 km^{2} (5.76 sq mi)
- Time zone: UTC+8 (China Standard)
- Postal code: 518054
- Area code: 755

Qianhai
- Simplified Chinese: 前海深港现代服务业合作区
- Traditional Chinese: 前海深港現代服務業合作區
Transcriptions
Standard Mandarin
- Hanyu Pinyin: Qiánhǎi Shēngǎng Xiàndài Fúwùyè Hézuòqū
Yue: Cantonese
- Jyutping: cin4 hoi2 sam1 gong2 jin6 doi6 fuk6 mou6 jip6 hap6 zok3 keoi1

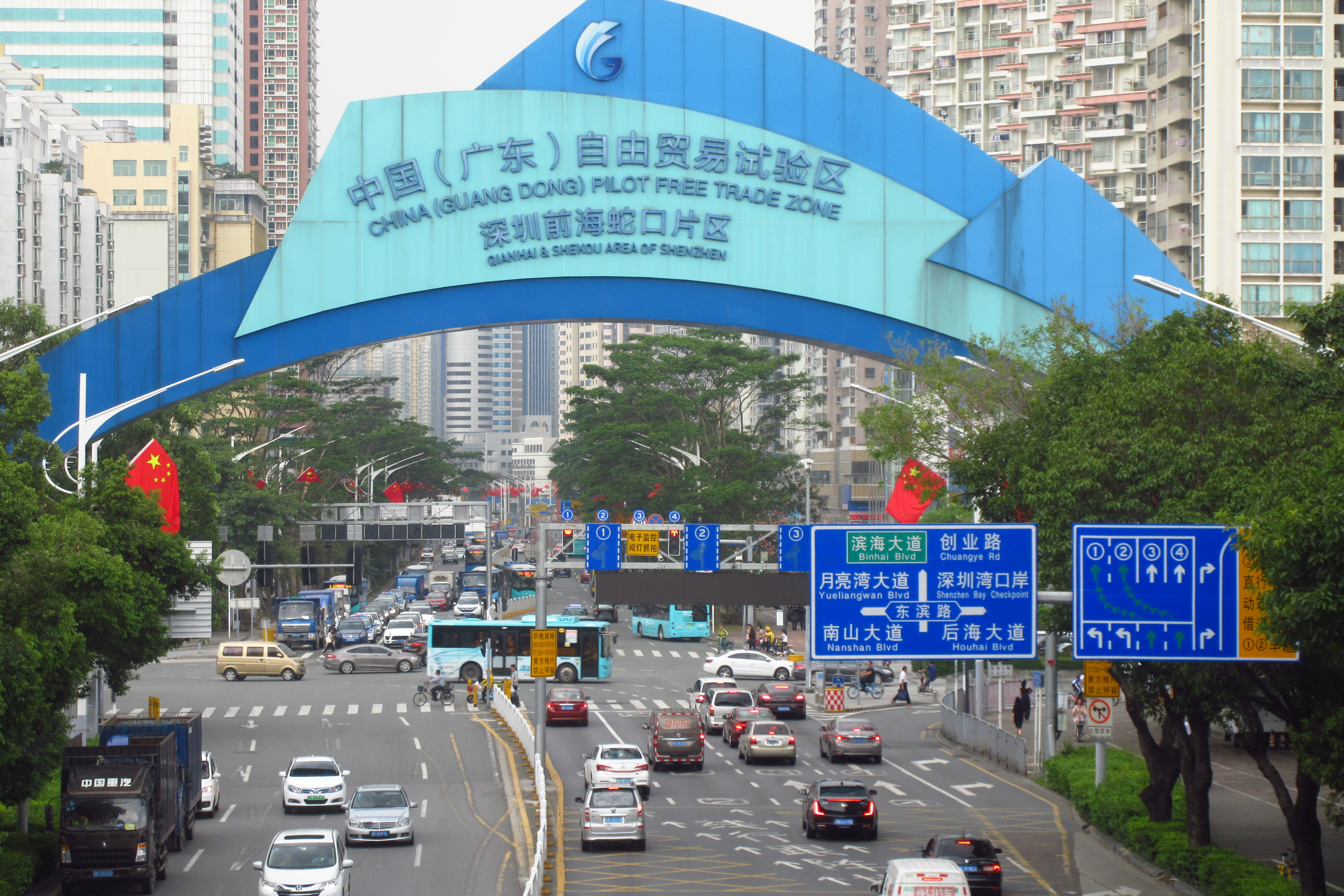
Qianhai zone

Qianhai Shenzhen-Hong Kong Modern Service Industry Cooperation Zone (simplified Chinese: 前海深港现代服务业合作区; traditional Chinese: 前海深港現代服務業合作區; pinyin: Qiánhǎi Shēngǎng Xiàndài Fúwùyè Hézuòqū) is a commercial development in Shenzhen, Guangdong that is also known as Qianhai New District. Located in Nanshan District and encircled by the Shuangjie River, Yueliangwan Boulevard, Mawan Boulevard and Qianhai Bay, Qianhai covers an area of approximately 15 square kilometres (5.8 sq mi), comprising almost entirely reclaimed land. As of 2024, its GDP exceeded RMB 300 billion (8.6% YoY growth), and total trade reached RMB 706.65 billion (+42.4% YoY).

== Strategic positioning ==
According to plans made by the Qianhai administration, as the pilot district for cooperation between mainland China and Hong Kong and innovation in the service industry, Qianhai undertakes four functions:

1. An area that will aim to facilitate innovation in the modern service industry
2. An area that will aim to become a hub of modern services and modern service development
3. A pilot area for closer cooperation between mainland China and Hong Kong
4. A facilitator in the industrial reform and sustainable economic development of the Pearl River Delta

== Features ==
=== Location ===
Qianhai is situated in the Pearl River Delta. With the completion of railways and roads by 2020, Qianhai will be within a one-hour commuting radius of the Pearl River Delta and within a 30-minute commuting radius of Hong Kong. The main arteries of traffic in the region, including the Shenzhen-Zhongshan corridor, Shenzhen Western Port, Shenzhen North Station and Guangzhou-Shenzhen Yanjiang Highway all pass through Qianhai.

=== Industrial support ===
The city of Shenzhen, where Qianhai is located, is one of the most economically developed regions in the Pearl River Delta and mainland China. As one of the most economically productive cities in China, Shenzhen has the highest GDP per capita, foreign export volume, the number of patent applications and the number of patents owned per capita among all major cities in China.

== Special policies ==
The following policies were approved by the State Council on June 27, 2012.

=== Financial policies ===
- Qianhai shall experiment with the expansion of offshore RMB fund flow-back channels. Qianhai will support the development of Hong Kong as an offshore RMB settlement centre and establish a cross-border RMB innovation zone in order to facilitate the development of RMB financial services.
- Qianhai shall support the issuance of RMB loans from local banking institutions to international projects, and from Hong Kong-based banking institutions to Qianhai projects under the stipulations of the Mainland and Hong Kong Closer Economic Partnership Arrangement (CEPA).
- Qianhai shall be supported in its efforts to establish an equity investment parent fund in Qianhai.
- Hasten the internationalization of Qianhai's financial market by opening up to Hong Kong under the stipulations of CEPA
- Qianhai supports the development of innovative financial instruments, and financial products that support the development of the real economy.
- Hong Kong and international banking institutions shall be encouraged to establish their headquarters in Qianhai in order to quicken the pace of the internationalization of Qianhai's financial industry.

=== Taxation policies ===
- Eligible companies registered in Qianhai are subject to a 15 percent preferential corporate income tax rate.
- Eligible professionals who are employed in Qianhai are exempt from personal income tax.

=== Legal policies ===
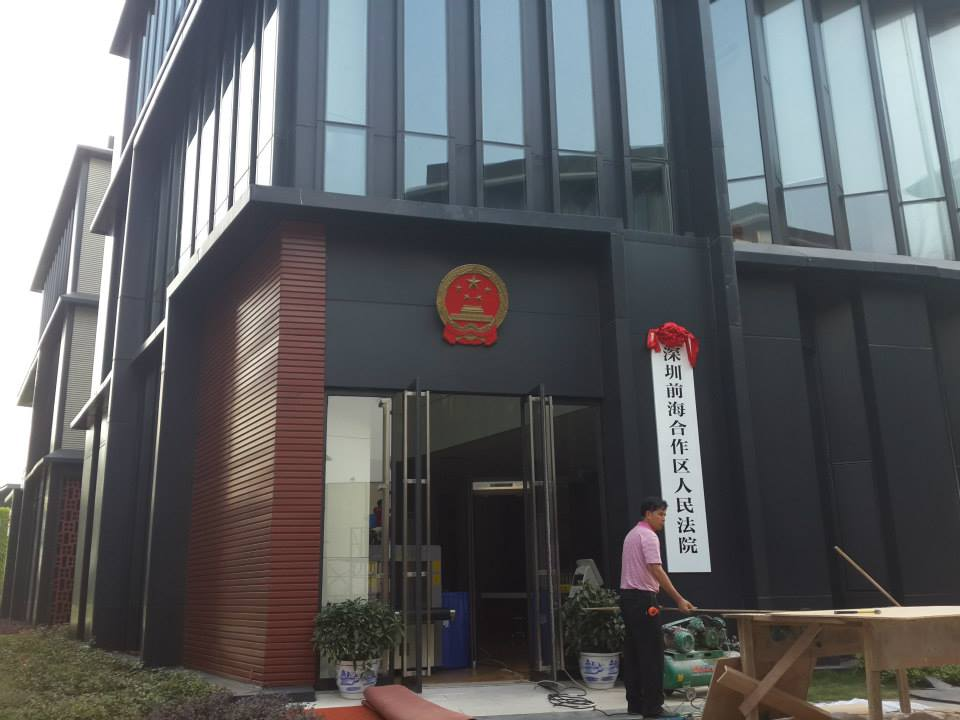
Shenzhen Qianhai Cooperation Zone People's Court

- Qianhai shall support Hong Kong arbitration agencies' establishment of affiliated agencies in Qianhai.
- Qianhai shall support the joint operation of mainland and Hong Kong law firms under CEPA and its supplementary agreements.

Shenzhen Qianhai Cooperation Zone People's Court was established in 2015 as a national judicial reform pilot, it specializes in foreign-related and Hong Kong/Macao/Taiwan commercial cases, handling claims up to RMB 50 million.

=== Human resource policies ===
- Qianhai's human resource management mechanism shall be innovated and relevant policies and measures shall be formulated to attract a professional, international workforce, including but not limited to professionals from Hong Kong, Macau, and Taiwan, as well as Chinese professionals who are currently working or studying abroad or those who have returned to China.
- Professionals with certification from Hong Kong shall be permitted to provide professional services, the boundary of which is confined to Qianhai and to the enterprises and residents of Qianhai. The specific policies, measures, and regulations of such services shall be formulated by relevant regulatory departments.
- Professionals from Hong Kong with the certificates of Certified Public Accountant of China shall be permitted to serve as partners of mainland Chinese accounting firms. The pilot trial procedures will be formulated by Shenzhen and will be implemented in Qianhai upon the approval of the Ministry of Finance.

=== Education and health care policies ===
- Hong Kong education service providers are permitted to set up international schools invested by Hong Kong investors in Qianhai upon approval.
- Hong Kong health care service providers are permitted to establish hospitals invested by Hong Kong investors in Qianhai.

=== Telecommunications policies ===
- Hong Kong and Macau telecom operators are permitted to establish telecom joint ventures with mainland Chinese operators in Qianhai under the stipulations of CEPA.
- Qianhai will establish a dedicated telecommunications channel in order to provide a better and faster channel for telecom businesses as well as other firms in Qianhai.

== Future leading industries ==
As a modern service industry cooperation zone, Qianhai's administration has planned to focus on finance, modern logistics, information services, technology services, and other professional services.

=== Finance ===
The Qianhai administration plans to promote innovation and partnership within the financial industry by relaxing currency flows between Qianhai and Hong Kong, reinforcing Hong Kong's position as an offshore RMB settlement centre. This initiative is meant to spearhead the internationalisation of Shenzhen's capital market, as well as strengthen the partnership between securities markets in Shenzhen and Hong Kong. Qianhai's financial services will aim to complement that of Hong Kong's, in a conscious effort to avoid direct competition and create a win-win situation.

More specifically, Hong Kong banks will be allowed to extend commercial RMB loans to Qianhai-based onshore mainland entities. The People's Bank of China has also indicated that such loans will for the first time not be subject to the benchmark rates set by the central bank for all other loans in the rest of China. The beginning of this "cross-border yuan loan program has opened a new channel for the back flow of overseas yuan funds, which will increase the yuan's global liquidity and promote its internationalisation," according to Linan Liu, a senior strategist for greater China at Deutsche Bank AG.

==== Qianhai Equity Trading Centre ====
The Qianhai Equity Trading Centre will provide loans to Qianhai enterprises by launching RMB-denominated wealth management products (WMPs) on the Hong Kong capital market.

=== Modern logistics ===
Qianhai has implemented preferential policies which will effectively allow logistics providers to offer improved and more flexible services across mainland China and globally.

==== Qianhai Bay Free Trade Port Zone ====
The Qianhai Bay Free Trade Port Zone is one of the vital components of the Qianhai Shenzhen-Hong Kong Modern Service Industry Cooperation Zone. The construction of 7 warehouses with a total area of 400,000m² has been completed, among which 12,000 m^{2} (130,000 sq ft) are for refrigerated bonded warehouses.

=== Information services ===
The Qianhai administration will promote the development of software and information technology services, as well as facilitate the cooperation between mainland and Hong Kong telecom operators.

=== Technology and other professional services ===
Qianhai will give priority to the development of innovative technologies, creative design services, as well as professional services such as consulting and management. As industrial reform is now underway in the Pearl River Delta, Qianhai's strategic positioning includes the plan to provide manufacturers with new technologies and other professional services to support their reforming efforts and facilitate a smoother transition.

== Urban planning ==
With a planned area of 14.92 square kilometres (5.76 sq mi) and total construction area of 26-30 million m^{2}, Qianhai is expected to create 650,000 jobs and house 150,000 residents by 2020. According to the city blueprint, Qianhai's residents will have access to a park and greenery within 100 metres (330 ft), the ability to reach public transportation within 200 metres (660 ft), shopping malls, restaurants, and hotels within 500 metres (1,600 ft), and education and health care services within 1,000 metres (3,300 ft) of any given point in the city. In order to attract and retain a creative workforce, the Qianhai administration has claimed that it will aim to establish an internationalised education system, as well as a Hong Kong-standard health care system.

The Qianhai administration has stated that it will prioritise public transportation and sustainable development. All Qianhai buildings will meet international environmental standards, and the energy consumption of buildings will be closely monitored and controlled. There is a planned 150 million yuan investment in reforestation, and investments in clean energy, water and waste recycling as well as sustainable urban management.

=== Current projects ===
==== Qianhai Enterprise Dream Park ====
An example of Qianhai's future work environment, the Qianhai Enterprise Dream Park is modelled after the Silicon Valley, with 58 office buildings and a multi-purpose building that can be used as a conference and exhibition hall and an exchange platform. Companies who are planning to move in or have already moved in include the Hong Kong and Shanghai Banking Corporation (HSBC), Hang Seng Bank, Industrial and Commercial Bank of China (ICBC), China Mobile, etc. Although some companies have moved in, there is still ongoing construction. The area will be completed by the end of 2014.

==== Qianhai Youth Entrepreneur Innovation Hub ====
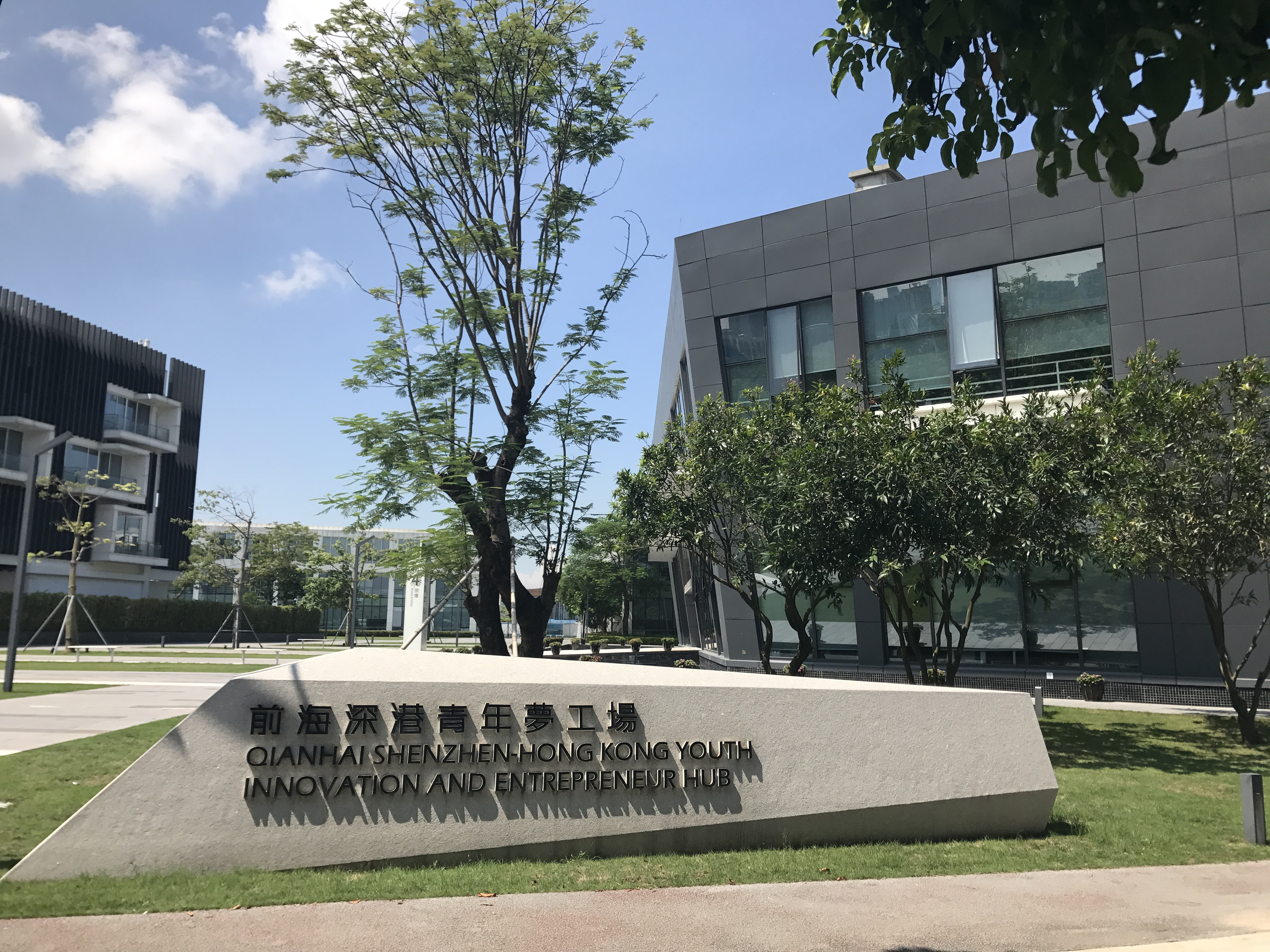
Qianhai Shenzhen-Hong Kong Youth Innovation and Entrepreneur Hub

The Qianhai Youth Hub is an area intended to become a community dedicated to supporting innovation among young entrepreneurs. It aims to provide access to venture capital, opportunities to establish businesses in one of China's most active economies, and opportunities to network with companies and like-minded individuals from abroad, particularly young people from Hong Kong.

Established to foster cross-border entrepreneurship, the hub spans 920,000 m^{2} (north section operational since 2022), offering specialized zones for AI, fintech, and green tech startups. Key features:

- Policy Support: Implements "12 Measures for Supporting Hong Kong/Macao Youth", providing subsidies, streamlined licensing for 23 professions, and tax incentives.
- Incubation Results: Hosts 9,055 Hong Kong-registered firms and incubated 691 Hong Kong startups (as of 2024), including AI firm Phantom Future and eco-tech leader Cooh Science.
- Infrastructure: Features R&D labs, co-working spaces, and a Hong Kong-style neighborhood with subsidized "1 Yuan Rent" workspaces.
- Ecosystem: Hosts annual Qianhai GBA Youth Innovation Competition, partnered with Tencent, Huawei, and Hong Kong universities.
- Over 10,000 Hong Kong residents work or reside here6, supported by cross-border legal/financial frameworks.
