= East Lake =

East Lake may refer to:

== Places ==
=== China ===
- East Lake Park, Shenzhen, Guangdong
- East Lake (Wuhan), Hubei
  - East Lake Cherry Blossom Park
- East Lake (Haikou), a set of twin lakes in Haikou, Hainan
  - East Lake Triangle Pool or East Lake, two small lakes in Haikou, China
- East Lake Park, Fengxiang County, Shaanxi
- East Lake (Wuhan) or Donghu, a large lake in Wuhan, China, and the national park around it

=== United States ===
- East Lake (Atlanta), a neighborhood of Atlanta, Georgia
  - East Lake Golf Club
  - East Lake (MARTA station)
- East Lake (Oregon), a lake in Central Oregon
- East Lake, Hillsborough County, Florida, unincorporated community
- East Lake, Pinellas County, Florida, census-designated place
- East Lake-Orient Park, Florida, unincorporated community
- East Lake, Minnesota, an unincorporated community
- East Lake, Missouri, a ghost town
- East Lake, Birmingham, a neighborhood in Birmingham, Alabama (see List of neighborhoods in Birmingham, Alabama)

=== Other places ===
- East Lake (New Zealand), a proposed rowing lake in Christchurch, New Zealand

== Other uses ==
- East Lake Academy, Lake Forest, Illinois, USA

== See also ==
- Donghu (disambiguation)
- Eastlake (disambiguation)
