= Eastlake =

Eastlake may refer to:

== Places ==
Australia

- Kingston, Australian Capital Territory, formerly called Eastlake
  - Eastlake Football Club, an amateur Australian Rules Football Club named after that location

United States

- Eastlake, Lake County, California
- Eastlake, San Diego County, California
- Eastlake, Colorado
- Eastlake, Michigan
- Eastlake, Ohio
- Eastlake, Seattle, Washington

== People ==
- Eastlake (surname)

== Education ==
- Eastlake Middle School, Chula Vista, California, US
- Eastlake High School (disambiguation), several schools

== Other uses ==
- Eastlake architecture, also known as Eastlake Movement

== See also ==
- East Lake (disambiguation)
- East (disambiguation)
- Lake (disambiguation)
- Eastlakes
