= Donghu =

Donghu may refer to:

- Donghu District (东湖区), in Nanchang, Jiangxi, China
- Donghu Subdistrict, Beijing (东湖街道), in Chaoyang District, Beijing, China
- Donghu Station (Taipei Metro)
- Donghu people, historical name for the Proto-Mongolic nomadic ethnic group whose descendants included the Wuhuan, Xianbei, and Rouran peoples

== See also ==
- East Lake (disambiguation)
- Beihu (disambiguation)
- Nanhu (disambiguation)
- Xihu (disambiguation)
