= List of parks in Shenzhen =

The following is a partial list of parks in Shenzhen, China, sorted in alphabetical order.

== List ==
Park	District	References	Photo
Bao'an Park (宝安公园)	Bao'an		
Bijiashan Park (笔架山公园)	Futian		
Dashahe Park (大沙河公园)	Nanshan		
Dutch Flower Town (深圳荷兰花卉小镇 pinyin: hélán huāhuì xiǎozhèn)	Nanshan		
East Lake Park or Donghu Park (东湖公园)	Luohu		
Fenghuangshan Forest Park (凤凰山森林公园)	Bao'an		
Haishan Park (海山公园)	Yantian		
Honghu Park (洪湖公园)	Luohu		
Huangggang Park (皇岗公园)	Futian		
Lianhuashan Park (莲花山公园)	Futian		
Lingzhi Park (灵芝公园)	Bao'an		
Lixiang Park (荔香公园)	Nanshan		
Lizhi Park (荔枝公园)	Futian		
Meilin Park (梅林公园)	Futian		
Nanshan Park (南山)	Nanshan		
People's Park (人民公园)	Luohu		
Qiniangshan Park (七娘山)	Dapeng New District		
Shenzhen Bay Park (深圳湾公园)/ Hongshulin Park(红树林)	Nanshan/Futian		
Sihai Park (四海公园)	Nanshan		
Tanglangshan Park (塘朗山公园)	Nanshan		
Universiade Nature Park (大运自然公园)	Longgang		
Wutongshan Park (梧桐山公园)	Luohu/Yantian		
Xin'an Park (新安公园)	Bao'an		
Yangtaishan Forest Park (羊台山森林公园)	Nanshan/Bao'an		
Shenzhen International Garden and Flower Expo Park (深圳园博园)	Futian		
Zhongshan Park (中山公园)	Nanshan		
Zhongxin Park (中心公园)	Futian		

== Theme Parks ==
Park	District	Photo
Dameisha Beach (大梅沙海滨公园)	Yantian	
Evergreen Resort (青青世界)	Nanshan	
Happy Valley (欢乐谷)	Nanshan	
OCT Bay (欢乐海岸)	Nanshan	
OCT East (东部华侨城)	Yantian	
Shenzhen Safari Park (深圳野生动物园)	Nanshan	
Splendid China (and China Folk Culture Village) (锦绣中华民俗村)	Nanshan	
Window of the World (世界之窗)	Nanshan	
Xianhu Botanical Garden (仙湖植物公园)	Luohu	
Xiaomeisha Beach (小梅沙海滨公园)	Yantian	
Xiaomeisha Sea World (小梅沙海洋世界)	Yantian	

== Former Parks ==
Park	Year opened	Year closed	District	Photo
Minsk World (明斯克航母世界)	2000	2016	Yantian	
Xiangmihu Amusement Park (香蜜湖游乐场)	1985	2010	Futian	

== See also ==
- List of lakes and reservoirs in Shenzhen
