= Wutong Mountain =

Mountain in Shenzhen, China

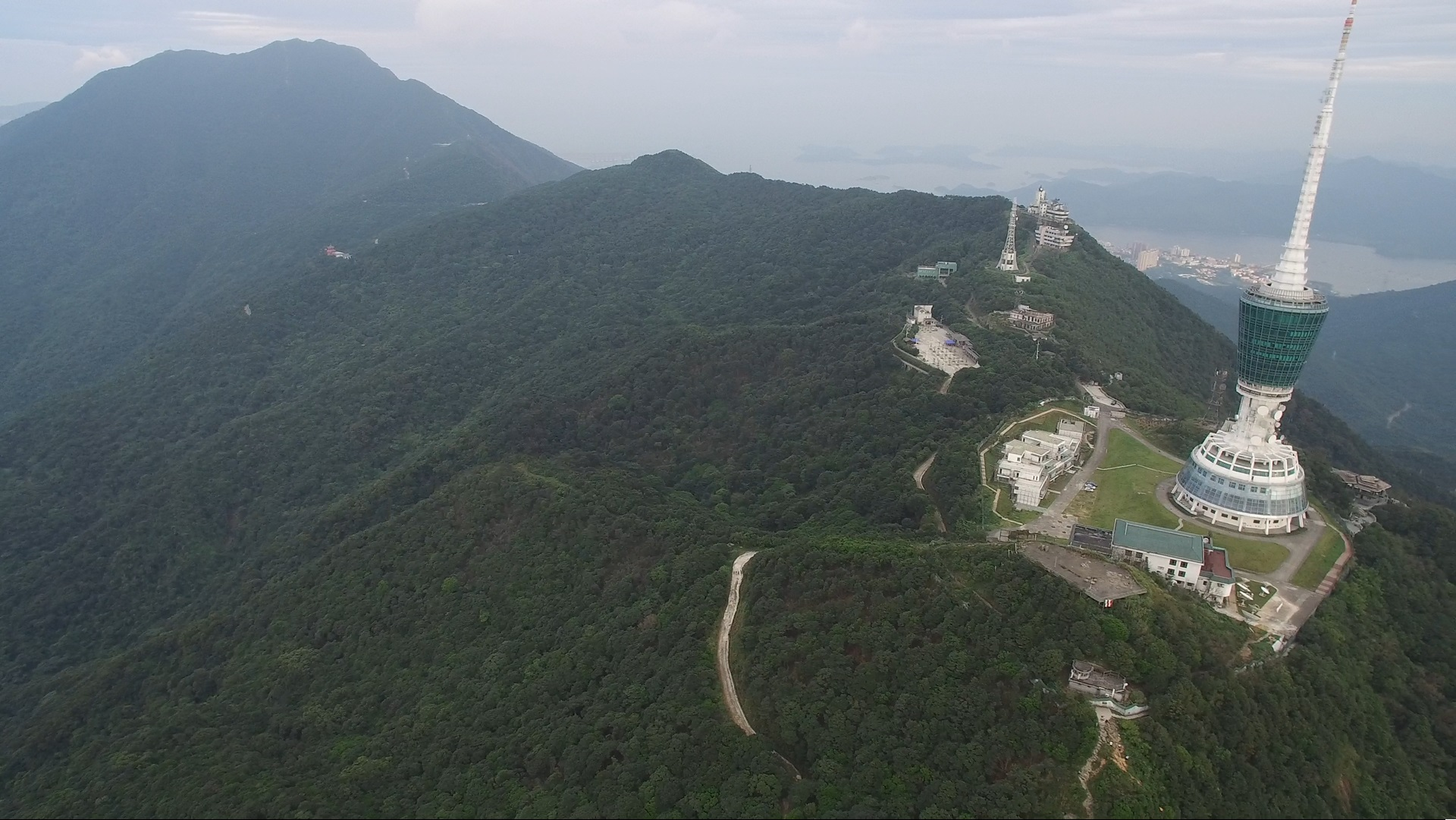
- Wutong Mountain and Shenzhen TV tower seen from the air

Highest point
- Elevation: 943.7 m (3,096 ft)
- Coordinates: 22°34′56.2″N 114°12′52.7″E

Naming
- Nickname: Lung of the city

Geography
- Location within Guangdong
- Location: On the border of Luohu and Yantian in Shenzhen, China
- Parent range: Lianhua Mountains

Chinese name
- Chinese: 梧桐山
- Cantonese Yale: Ǹghtùhngsāan
Transcriptions
Standard Mandarin
- Hanyu Pinyin: Wútóngshān
- Wade–Giles: Wu^{2}-t‘ung^{2}-shan^{1}
- IPA: [ǔ.tʰʊ̌ŋ.ʂán]
Yue: Cantonese
- Yale Romanization: Ǹghtùhngsāan
- Jyutping: ng4 tung4 saan1
- IPA: [ŋ.tʰʊŋ˩.san˥]

Wutong Mountain (Chinese: 梧桐山; pinyin: Wútóng Shān; Jyutping: Ng^{4}tung^{4} saan^{1}; Hong Kong Hakka: Ng^{2}tung^{2}san^{1}) is a mountain located near the border of Luohu and Yantian in Shenzhen, China. At 943.7m, it is the tallest mountain in Shenzhen. The mountain is also source of the Shenzhen River.

Wutong Mountain is a state-level urban scenic area with landscape features such as the integration of mountains, sea and lake, the integration of landscape and city, the overview of Shenzhen and Hong Kong, and the main functions of ecological and scenic resource protection, science popularization and scientific research, leisure, and sightseeing.

The main attraction of Wutong Mountain is the two main peaks of Big Wutong (Chinese: 大梧桐; pinyin: Dā Wútóng) and Little Wutong (Chinese: 小梧桐; pinyin: Xiǎo Wútóng). The Big Wutong is the highest peak in Shenzhen.

== Etymology ==
The name of Wutong comes from the earliest Chinese poetry book, Classic of Poetry (Chinese: 诗经; pinyin: Shījīng). Wutong tree is the Chinese parasol tree. The poem describes the growth of the Wutong tree, which makes the phoenix cry. Phoenix flew from the South China Sea to the North, only in the Wutong tree to fall, visible the nobleness of the plant. The legend of "Phoenix dwelling on Wutong Tree" is widely spread among the people. Therefore, the Wutong tree is endowed with spirituality and expresses people's good wishes for Wutong Mountain.

As for other possible etymologies of Wutong Mountain, according to Shenzhen Evening News, there are three possible speculations. The first speculation about the source of the name is based on the observation that the hills of Wutong Mountain undulate. Overlooking Mount Wutong, she was like a centipede, snaking for dozens of miles. That's why it was originally called "Centipede Mountain". Since the pronunciation of centipede in Mandarin (Chinese: 蜈蚣; pinyin: Wúgōng) is similar to Wutong, its name slowly evolved into Wutong Mountain. A second speculation is that the name is due to the fact that Wutong Mountain is dotted with thistle, which is a type of plant that pronounced the same as "Wutong" in mandarin. A third speculation about the etymology is that Wutong Mountain is named for its rich "strange grass of Chinese parasol tree", which refers to spiritual plants such as the Chinese parasol tree, plants of the orchid family and other plants with high ornamental and medicinal value.

== Geography ==
=== Topography ===
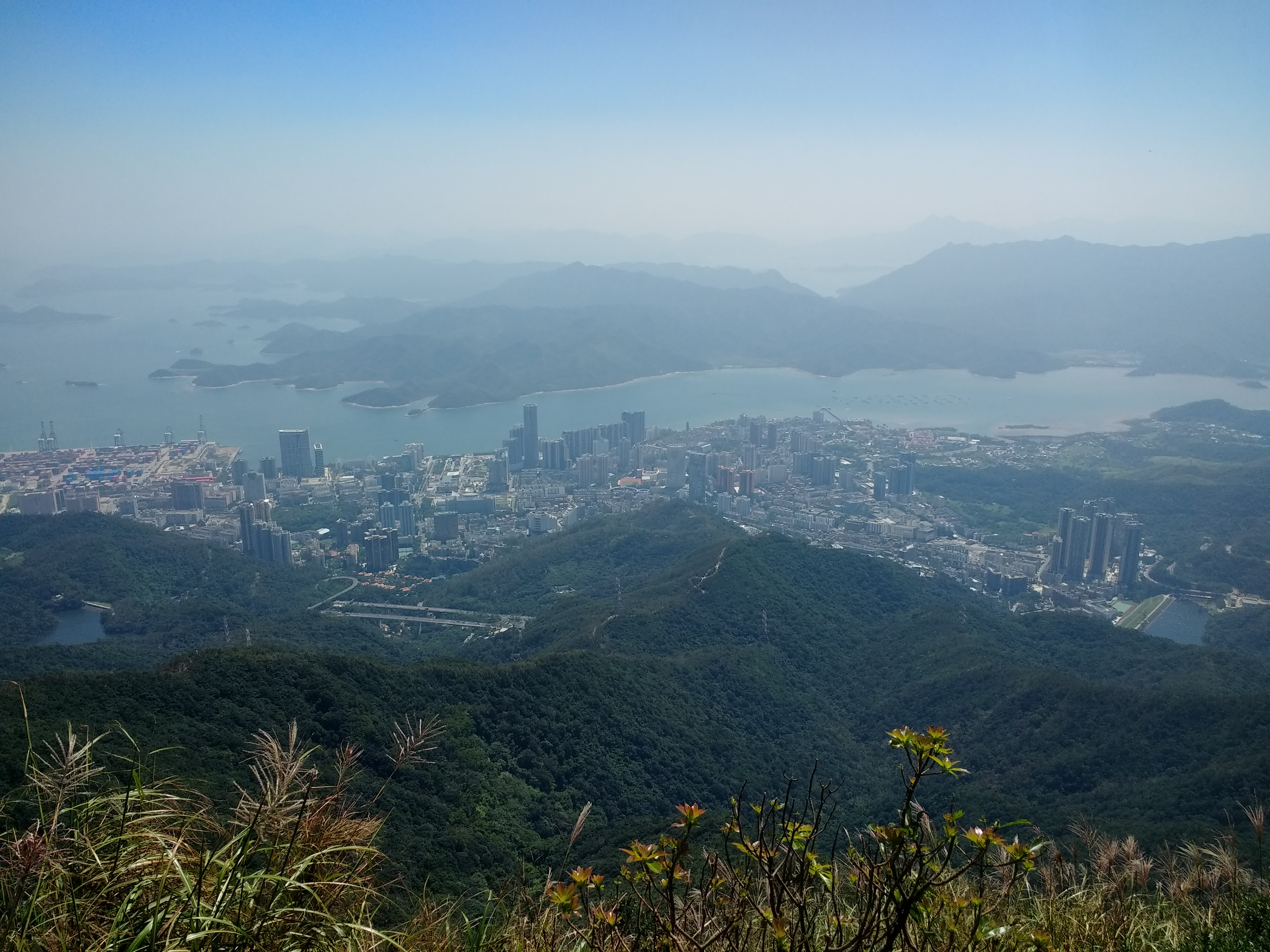
Mountain View of Mirs Bay

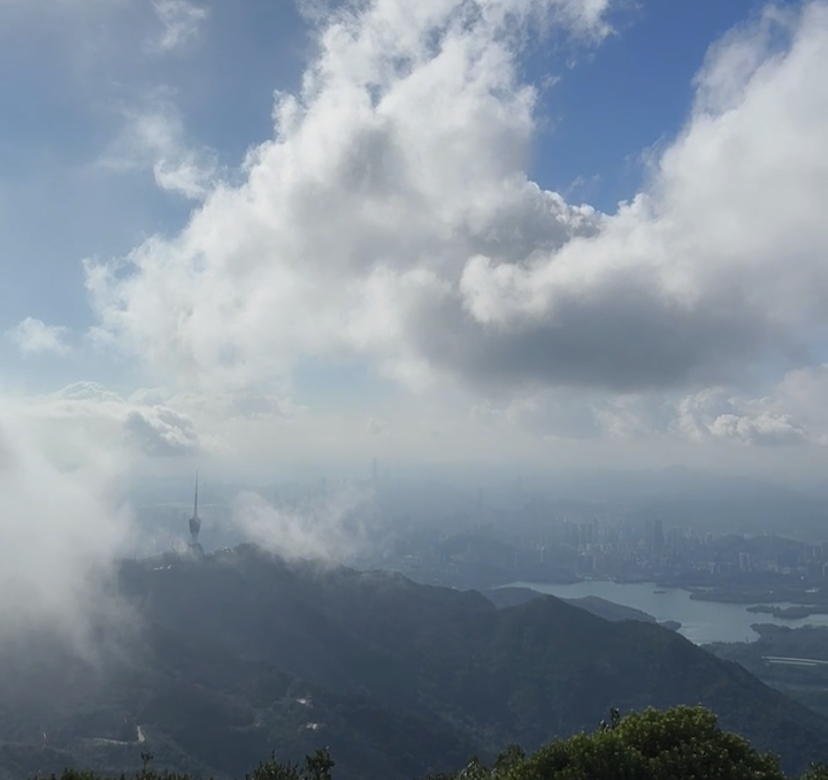
Wutong Clouds

With an area of 31.82 square kilometres (12.29 sq mi), founded in 1989 and situated in central south part of Shenzhen, Mount Wutong National Park nears the Mirs Bay of South China Sea in the east, connects Hong Kong in the south, borders on Shenzhen Reservoir in the west, approaches the secondary boundaries of the pre-Shenzhen Special Economic Zone in the north. With range of green hills, Wutong Mountain rises gradually from west to east. There are three main peaks, namely Small Wutong, Bean Curd Head and Big Wutong, which are called "Three Towering Peaks" in history. With an attitude of 943.7 metres (3,096 ft), Great Wutong is the highest peak in Shenzhen. The majestic mountain reflects the vast Mirs Bay and matches the cloud which changes irregularly. It connes Hong Kong with streams and mountains. Known far and wide, Wutong Mountain has a long history. "Wuling Heavenly Pound" had been praised as one of eight sceneries in Xin'an County in history. Now, "Wutong Clouds" has been listed as one of eight new sceneries of Shenzhen for its capricious and magic scenery.

=== Natural resources ===
Praised as "Lung of the city" vividly, vast vegetation of Wutong Mountain from the significant ecological barrier of Shenzhen. The forest coverage rate of Wutong Mountain reaches 88.6%. The types of vegetation in the mountain are multiple. South subtropics seasonal rainforest, mountainous orderly broad-leaf forest, hilltop dwarf forest, hilltop shrubs and glasses are distributed orderly from the foot to the top of the mountain. At present, such ecological sceneries as "Ten miles flowers of Rhododentron" and "Camellia flowers sea of Wutong" etc, which constructing according to the natural conditions of Wutong Mountain display striking "flower sea" sceneries.

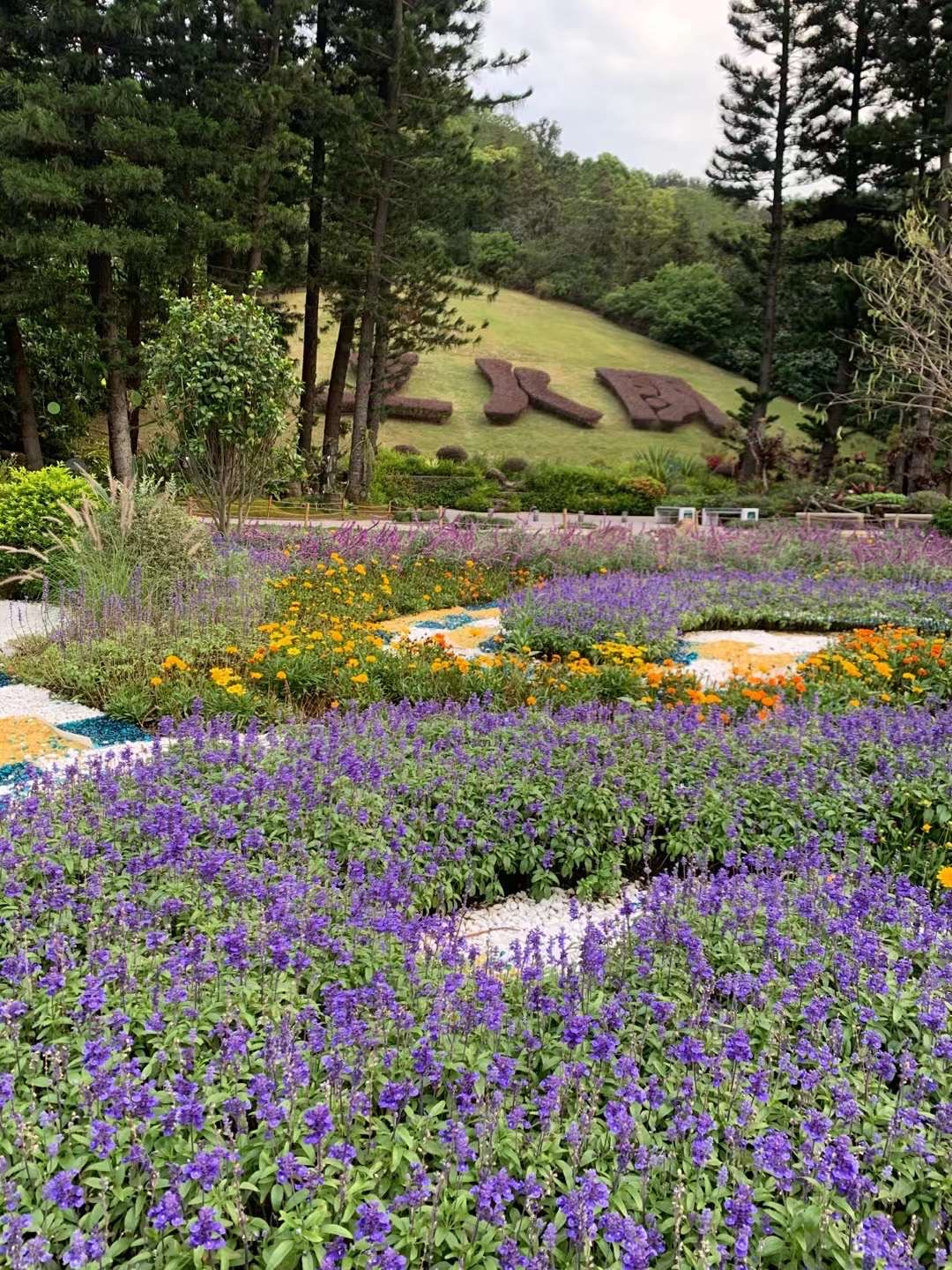
View of the Flower Sea

Wutong Mountain is a rare example of a natural scenic area in China that is located in an urban area. The park is divided into eight scenic areas such as "Musical Instrument in Phoenix Valley", "Wutong Clouds", "A Phoenix Perching on the Green Wutong", "East Lake Park" and "Fairy Lake Botanical Garden", etc. The forest surrounding the mountain has been protected since 1980. In 1984 it was designated as Shatoujiao–Haishan National Forest Park, China's second National Forest Park after Zhangjiajie, and was renamed Wutongshan National Forest Park in 1989. In 1993 it became a Provincial Area of Scenic and Historic Interest, and in 2009 it was promoted to a National Area of Scenic and Historic Interest.

=== Fauna and flora ===
Wutong Mountain with plentiful animals and plants resources is an important species gene bank of Shenzhen. Wutong Mountain is home to 1,376 species of rescular plants, 537 species of insects, 196 species of different animals in the national park, of which there are 36 species of plants such as Aquilaria sinensis, Amentotaxus argotaenia, Alsophila spinulosa etc. and over 20 species of animals such as Python molurus, Manis pentadactyla, virerricula indica etc. which were approved as national and key protected animals and plants.

== Cultural references ==
- The unique Hakka cultural atmosphere creates the unique strong Hakka cultural atmosphere of Wutong Mountain, which contains the charm of Hakka culture.
- In 111 BC (the sixth year of Yuan Ding), Emperor Wu set up nine counties, which belong to Boluo County of Nanhai County. From the Western Han Dynasty, Three Kingdoms to the Western Jin Dynasty, Wutong Mountain belonged to Boluo County, Nanhai County. Years after, it belonged to Xin 'an County. At that time, this mountain was called Wutong Mountain.
- Ge Hong, the famous Taoist grand master of the Eastern Jin Dynasty, practiced medicine and practiced in Mount Luofu, traveled to various famous mountains in Guangdong, and once visited Wutong Mountain.
- According to the records in Wutong Mountain Collection, Lü Dongbin, was fond of Wutong landscape, and he wrote more than 100 poems. In the early Ming Dynasty, the Wudang patriarch Zhang Sanfeng opened the Wutong Mountain to build many temples, and left more than poems.
- Wutong Mountain is very famous for its Taoist culture since ancient time. Wutong Mountain famous Taoist temple has "Shang Qing Palace, Taoyuanxian Cave, Jinxia Cave, Eight Highness Hall, Jinxia Cave, Zangxia Cave (Chinese: 上清宫、桃源仙洞、锦霞洞、八贤堂、金霞洞、藏霞洞)", worship "Northern Emperor, Jade Emperor, Wenchang Emperor, Guanyin Dashe, Guan Emperor, Sanqing patriarch, etc. (Chinese: 北帝（玄天上帝）、玉皇大帝、文昌帝君、观音大士、关帝、三清祖师等)"
- In 2004, Wutong Mountain was selected as one of the eight scenic spots in Shenzhen.

== Trails ==
There are multiple choices of trails to climb to the top of Wutong Mountain.

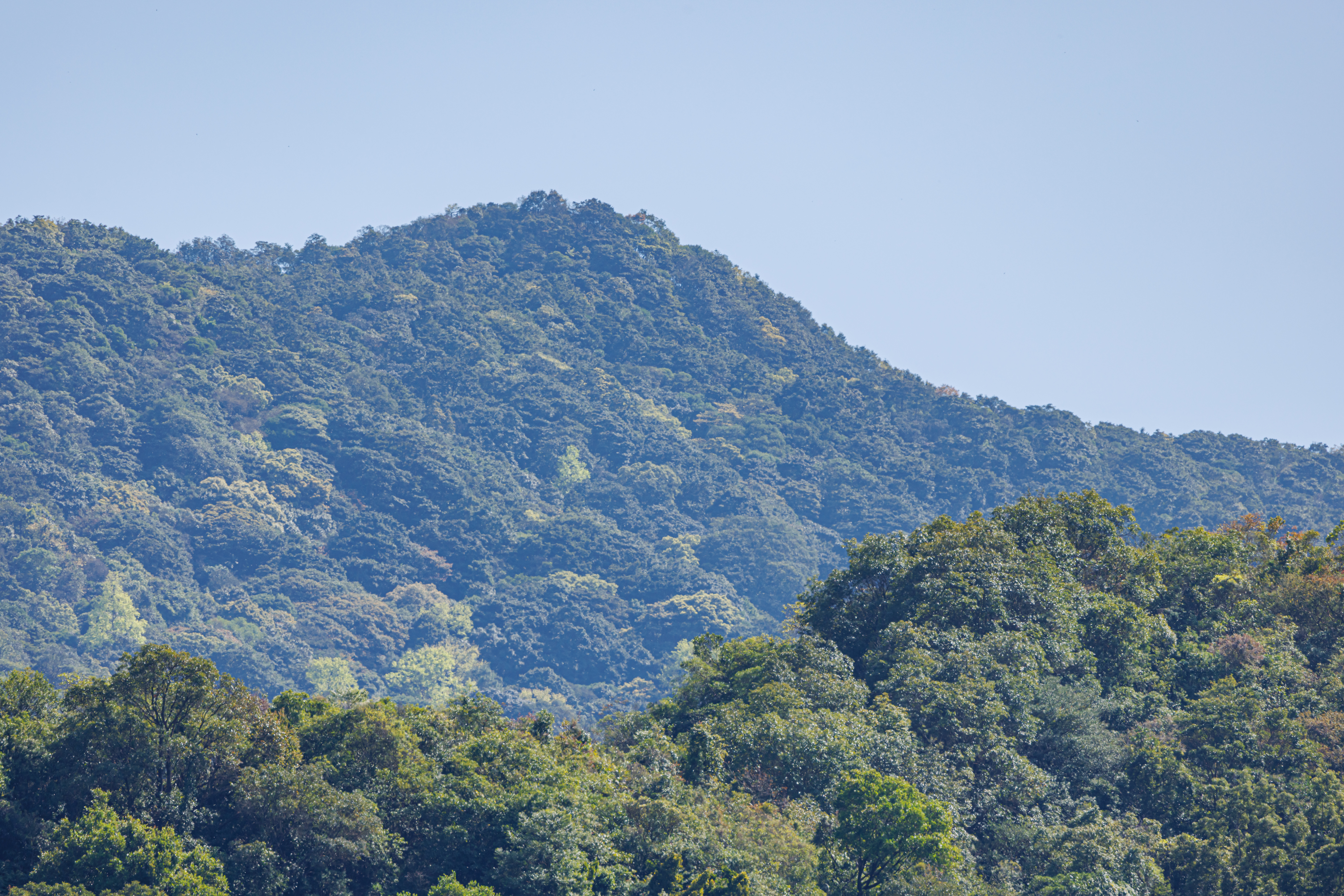
View of the forest of Wutong Mountain

=== Wutong Mountain Rd. North ===
Since no vehicles up the hill and cycling are allowed, from archway to Haohanpo Square is the easiest and has the highest safety factor.

Entrance: Northwest gate of Wutong Mountain

Route: Wutong Mountain North gate archway—Wutong Mountain Rd. North—Fenghuang Terrace—Small Wutong Square

Total distance: about 7.8 km

Time (One-way): 2.5-3.5 hours

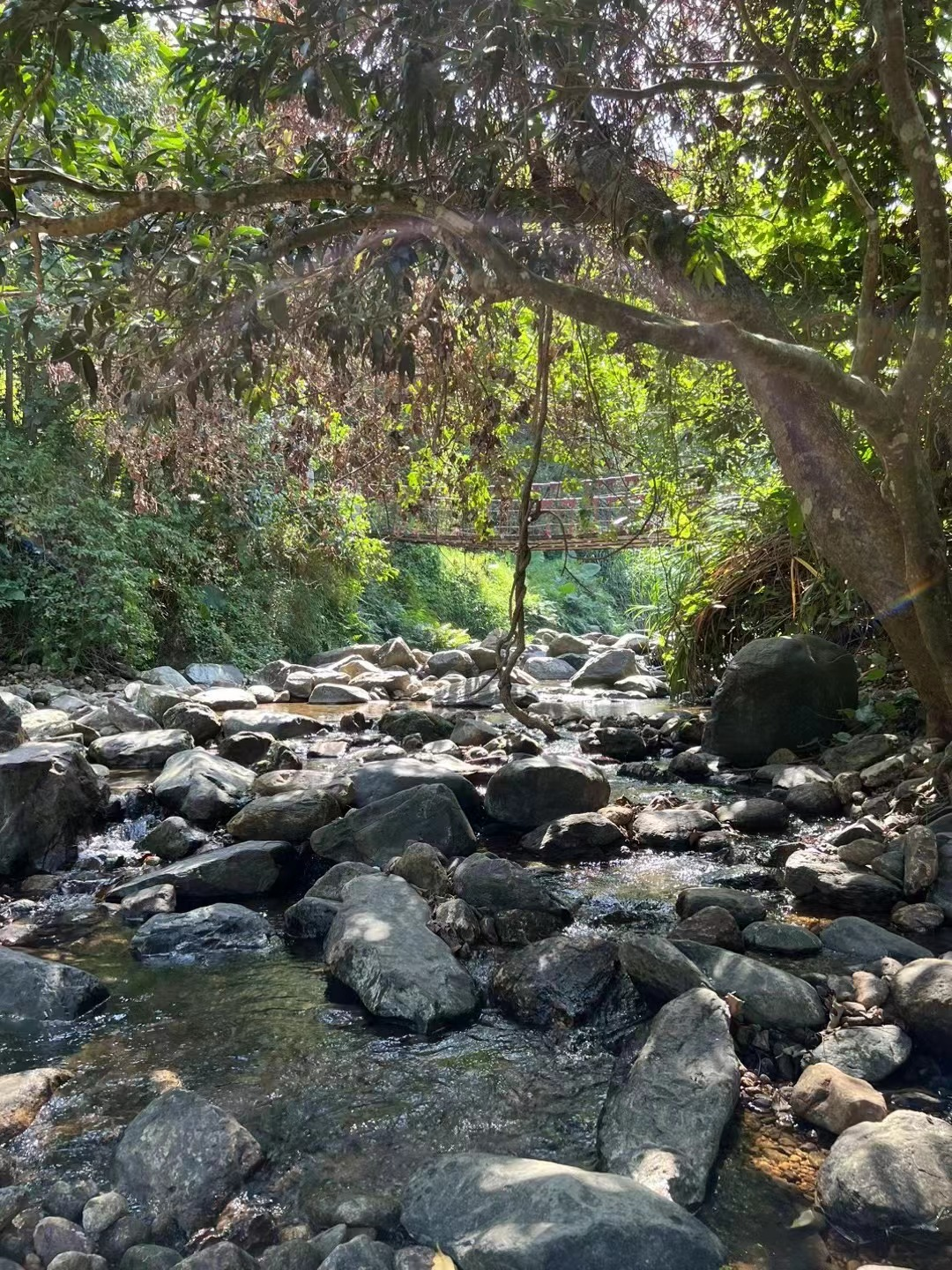
Taishan Stream Trail

=== Taishan Stream ===
Taishan Stream Trail is the Wutong Mountain scenic spot construction the earliest and most popular hiking trail.

Entrance: Northwest gate of Wutong Mountain

Route: Wutong Mountain North gate archway - Taishan stream - Hulu pool - Big Wutong peak

Total distance: about 5.5 km

Time (One-way): 3–4 hours

=== Bitong Rd. ===
The Bitong Road was officially completed in September 2007. It is the longest, most complete and most physically challenging hiking trail in Wutong Mountain Scenic Spot.

Entrance: Yantian District People's Hospital

Route: Yantian District Hospital (Seventh People's Hospital of Shenzhen) -- Bitong Rd. -- Conjunction with Xiutong Rd—Big Wutong Peak

Total distance: about 6.7 km

Time (One-way): 3–4 hours

== Festival Activities ==
=== Wutong Mountain Hiking Festival ===
On October 2, 2003, the first Wutong Mountain Hiking Festival was held in Shenzhen. Thousands of people participated in the festival. Since then, in order to encourage national sports and develop tourism in Wutong Mountain Scenic spot, one day in early October every year has been set as the Wutong Mountain Hiking Festival.

=== Floral displays ===
Before the pandemic, it was of significance for the Yantian District of Shenzhen to further promote the construction of ecological civilization and speed up the construction of a modern, international, and advanced coastal city in order to build a world-famous flower city. Through the measures of ecological road environment, humanization of leisure facilities, landscape of important nodes, and so on. Yantian District has made efforts to create a number of flower-themed boutique landscapes with landscape highlights and flower landscape avenues showing the characteristics of Yantian.

== Gallery ==
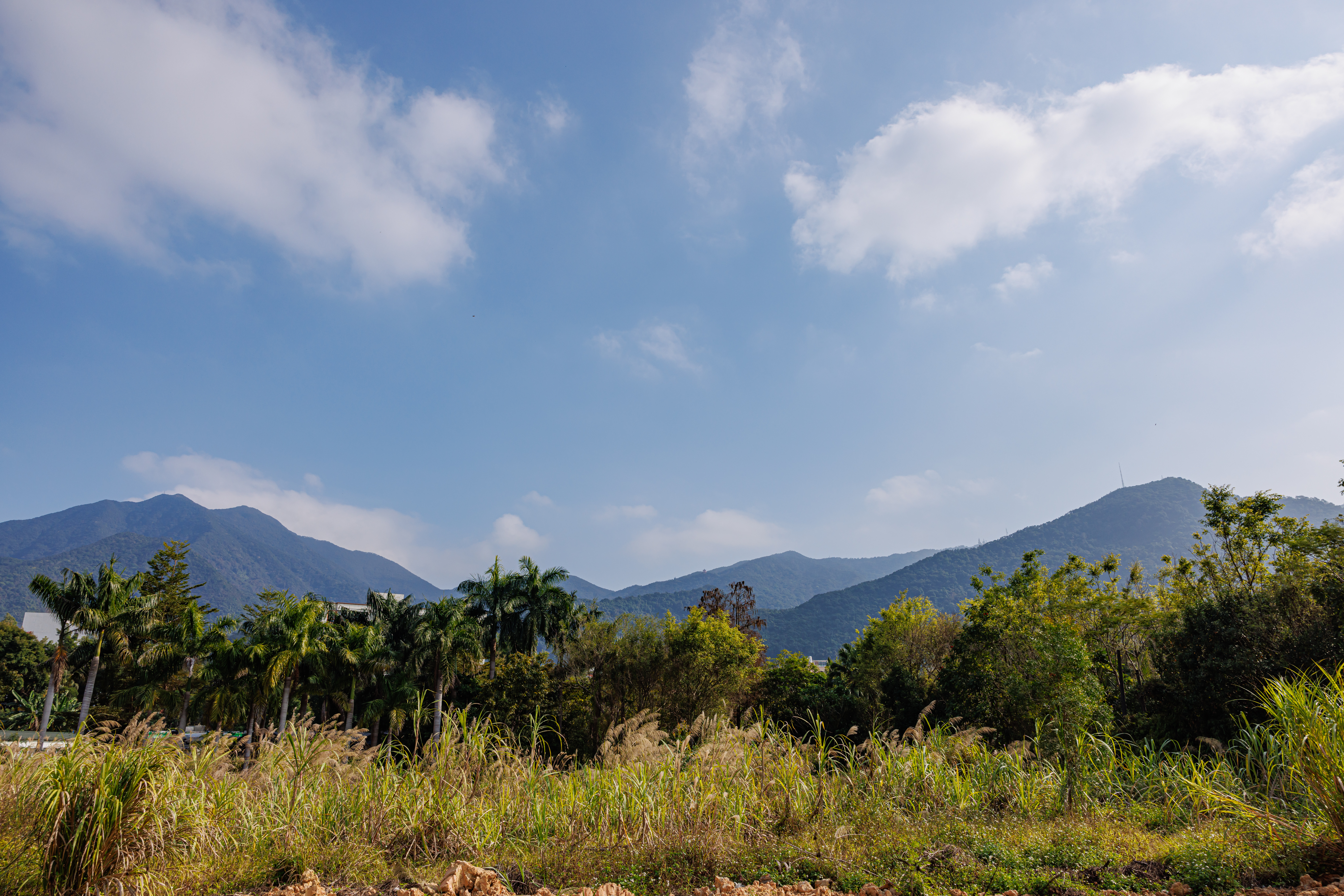
Wutong mountain range

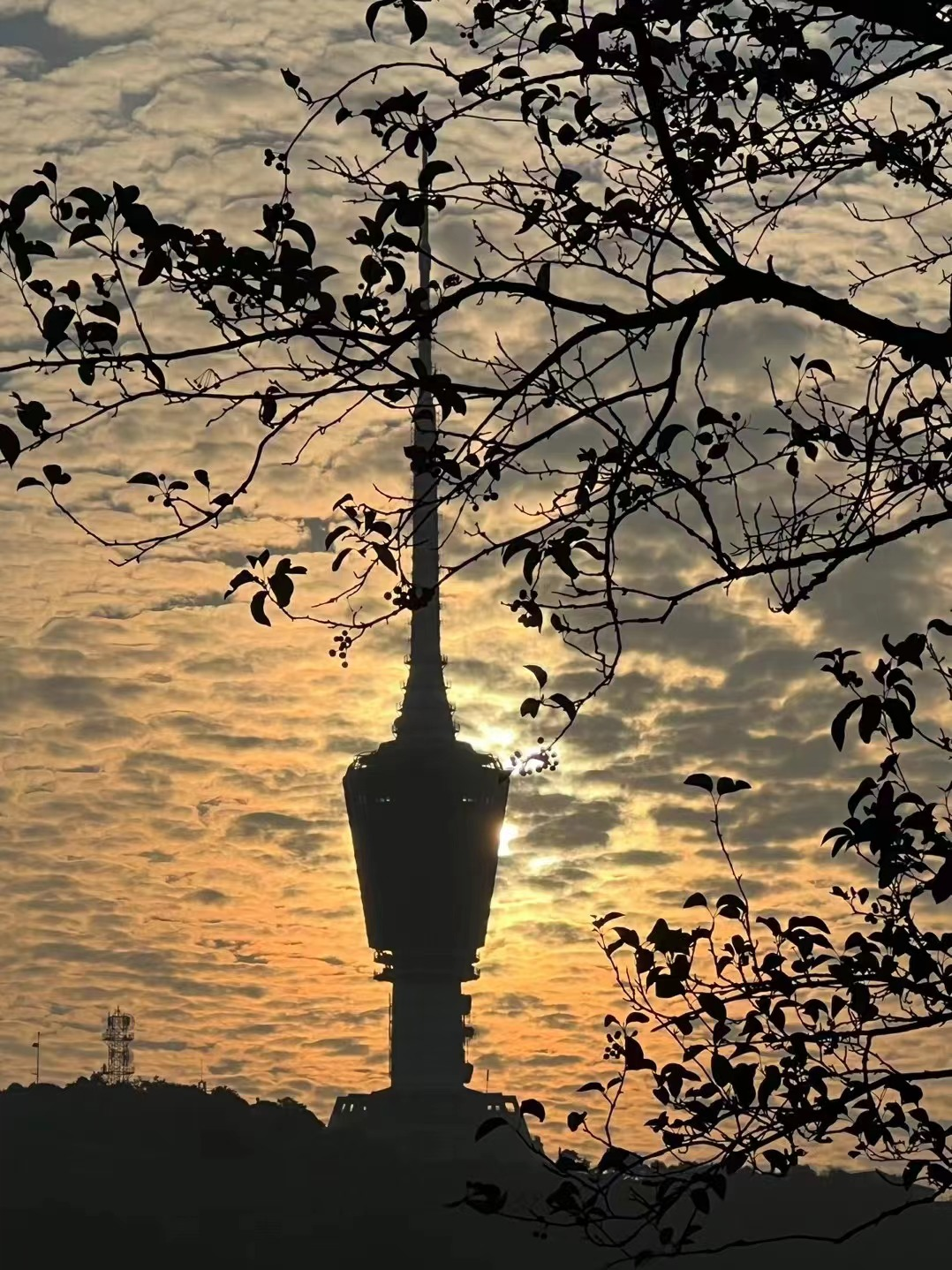
Shenzhen TV Tower under sunset

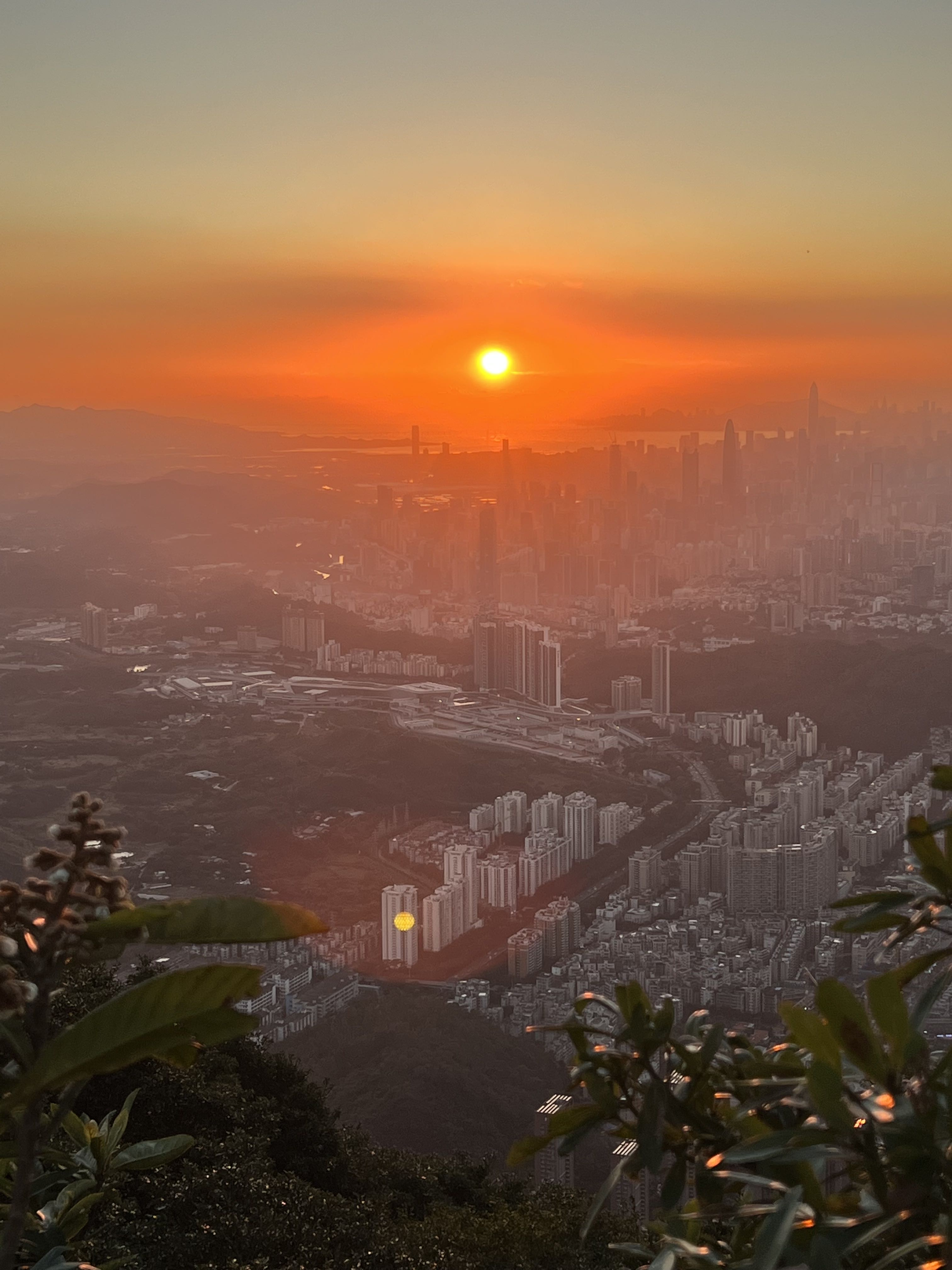
Shenzhen city skyline view from the peak under sunset

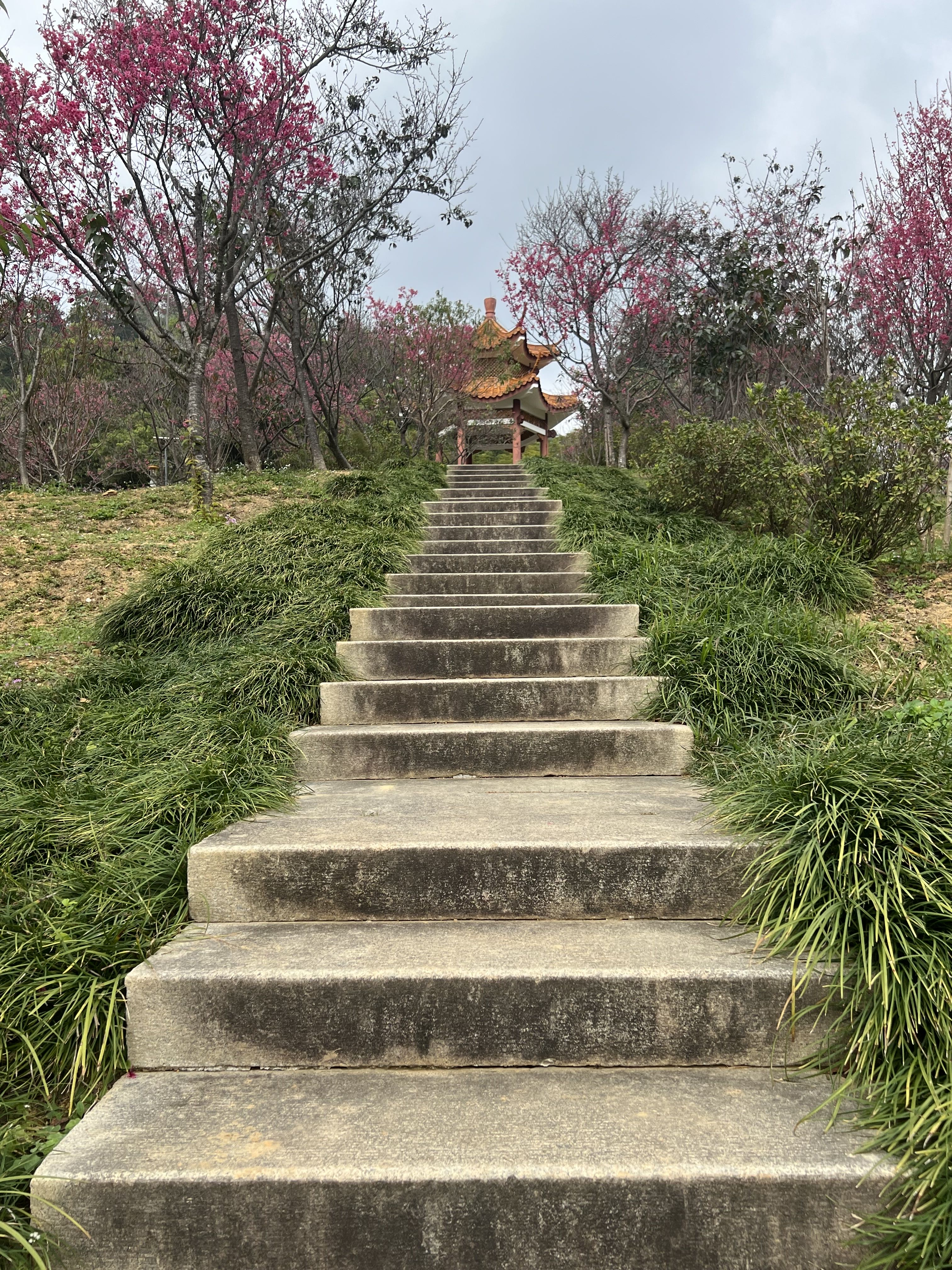
Stairway to the peak of Wutong Mountain

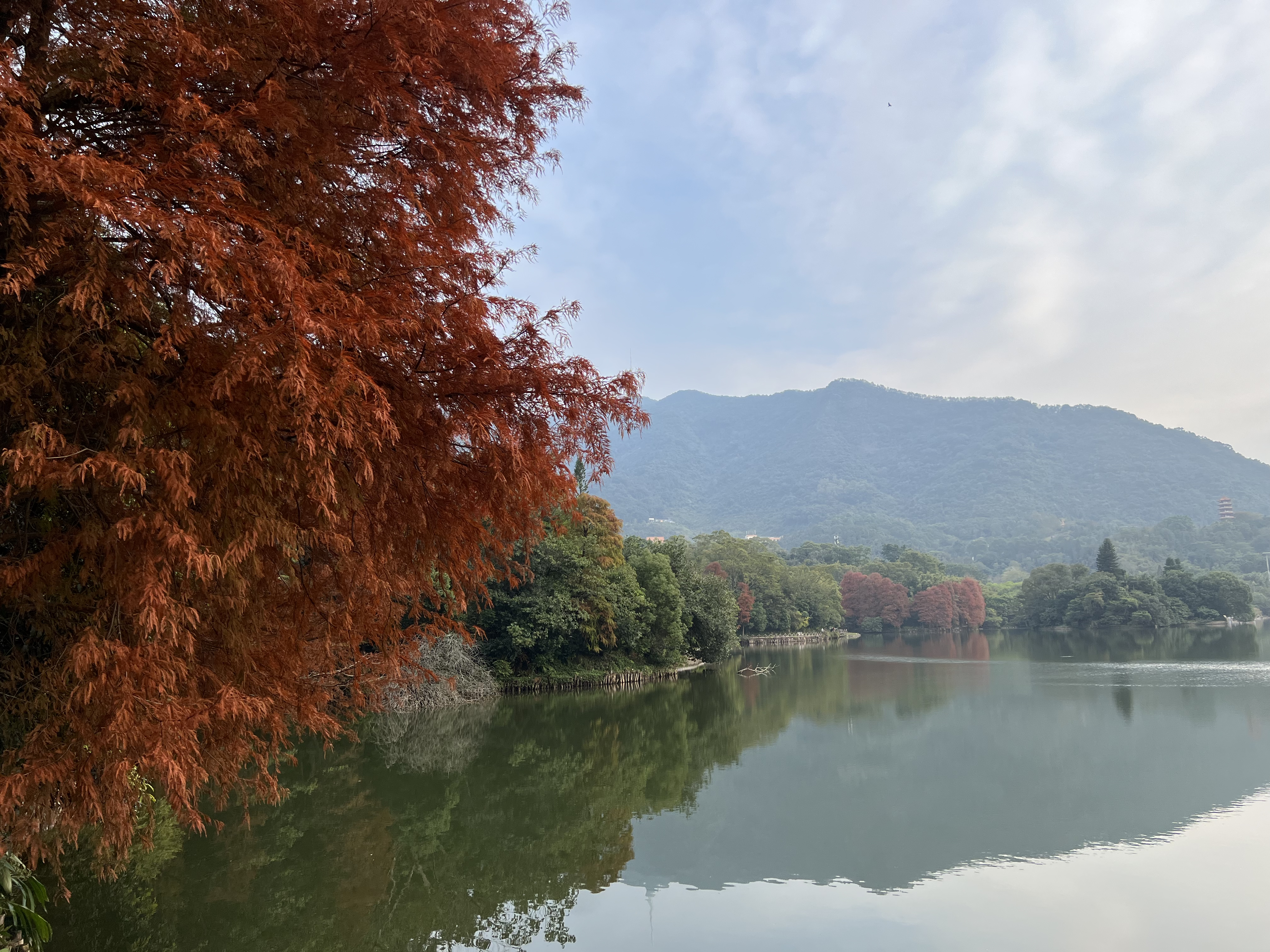
Peaceful lake view in the Wutong Mountain Scenic Spot

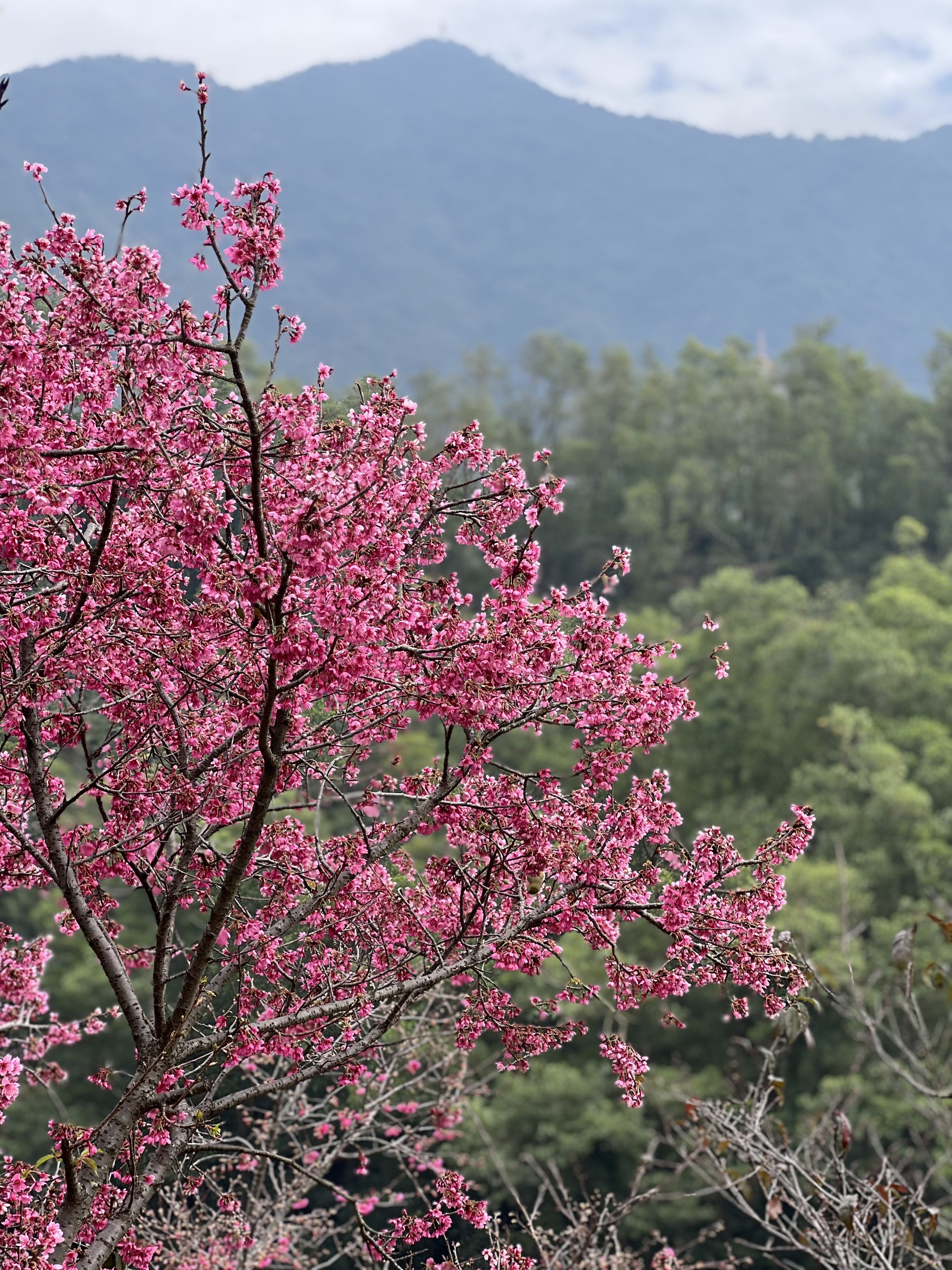
Wutong flowers

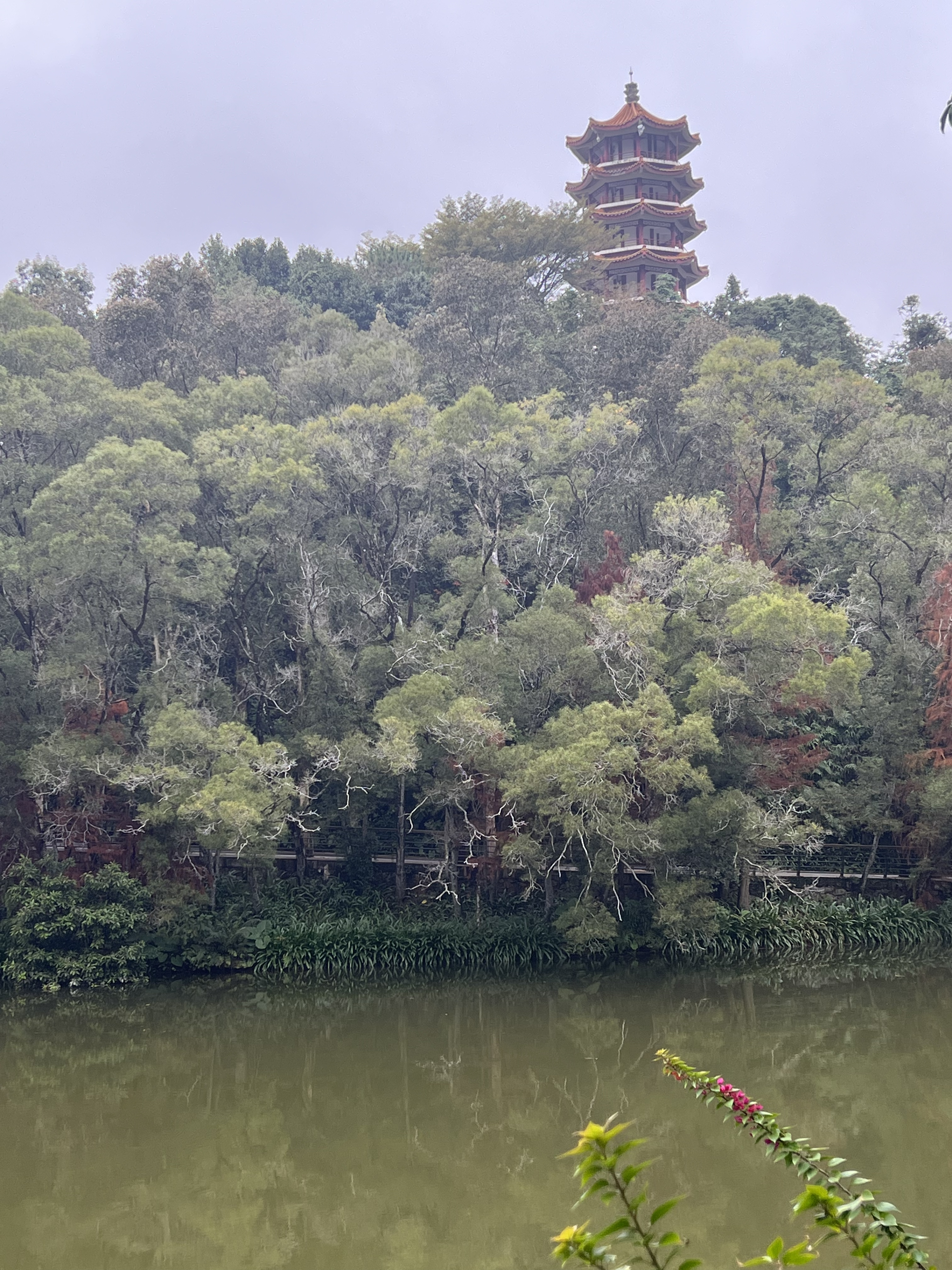
Wutong Temple view

== See also ==
- Qiniangshan
- List of parks in Shenzhen
