= People's Park (Shenzhen) =

Urban public park in Luohu, Shenzhen, Guangdong, China

- Renmin Park
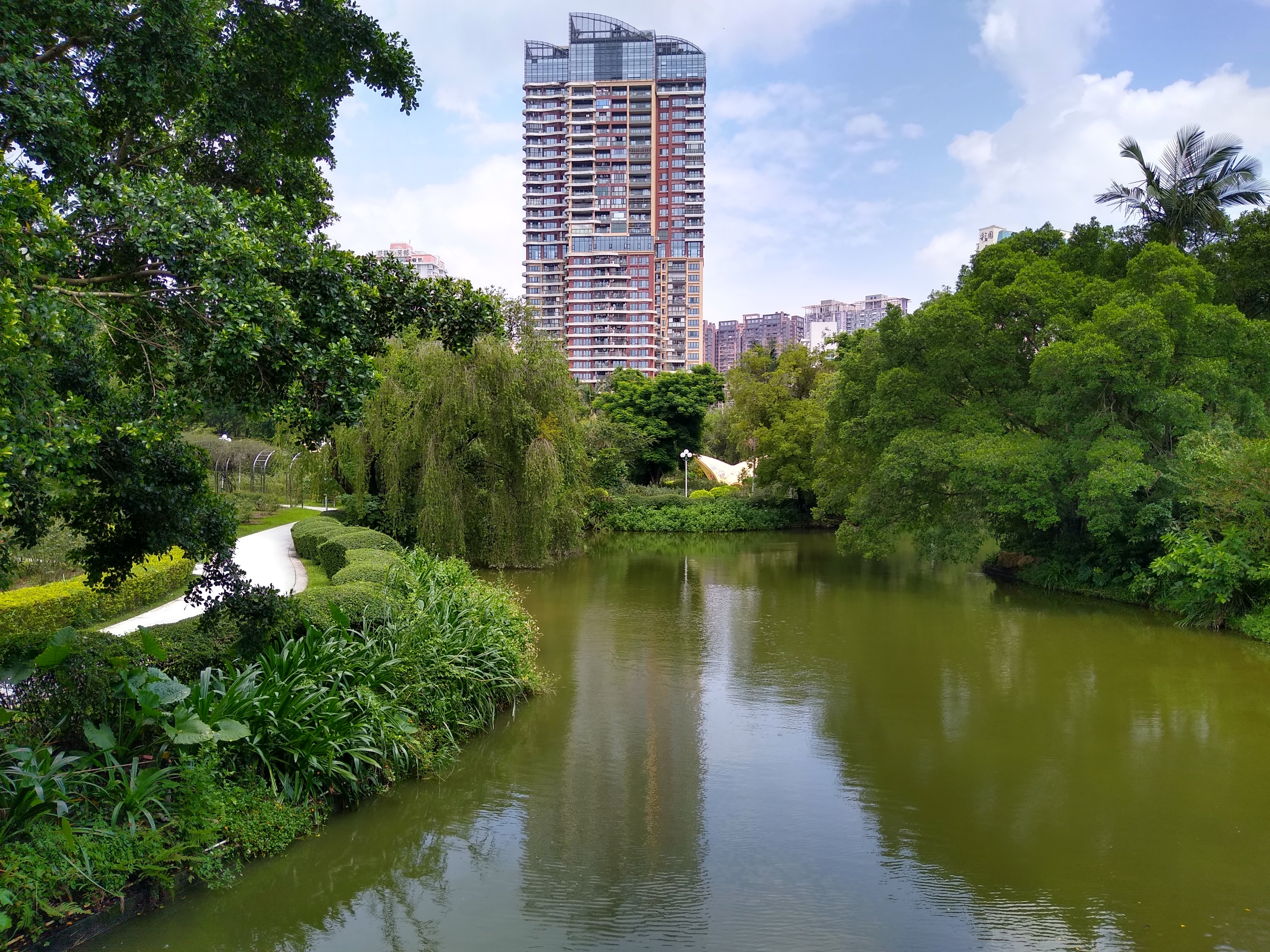
- Interactive map of People's Park
- Type: Urban park
- Location: Shenzhen, Guangdong, China
- Coordinates: 22°33′9.5″N 114°7′2″E
- Area: 12.95 ha (32.0 acres)
- Created: 1983

People's Park
- Simplified Chinese: 人民公园
- Traditional Chinese: 人民公園
Transcriptions
Standard Mandarin
- Hanyu Pinyin: Rénmín Gōngyuán
Yue: Cantonese
- Jyutping: jan4 man4 gung1 jyun4*2

People's Park (Chinese: 人民公园; pinyin: Rénmín Gōngyuán) is an urban public park in Luohu District of central Shenzhen in Guangdong province, China. Established in 1983, it is one of the first parks in Shenzhen.

Located on North Renmin Road, the park covers an area of 12.95 hectares (32.0 acres), including 2.1 hectares (5.2 acres) of lake. The hill in the park offers a panoramic view of the park and the city.

People's Park is best known for its rose garden on the central island. It is one of the largest rose gardens in China, with more than 50,000 flowers of over 300 cultivars. It is a popular tourist destination during the flowering season from early December to late February. The park hosts an annual rose exhibition. In 2014, the 16th exhibition was held in early February during the Chinese New Year holiday.

== See also ==
- List of parks in Shenzhen
