= Zhongshan Park (Shenzhen) =

Urban park in Shenzhen, China

Coordinates: 22.5497°N 113.9144°E

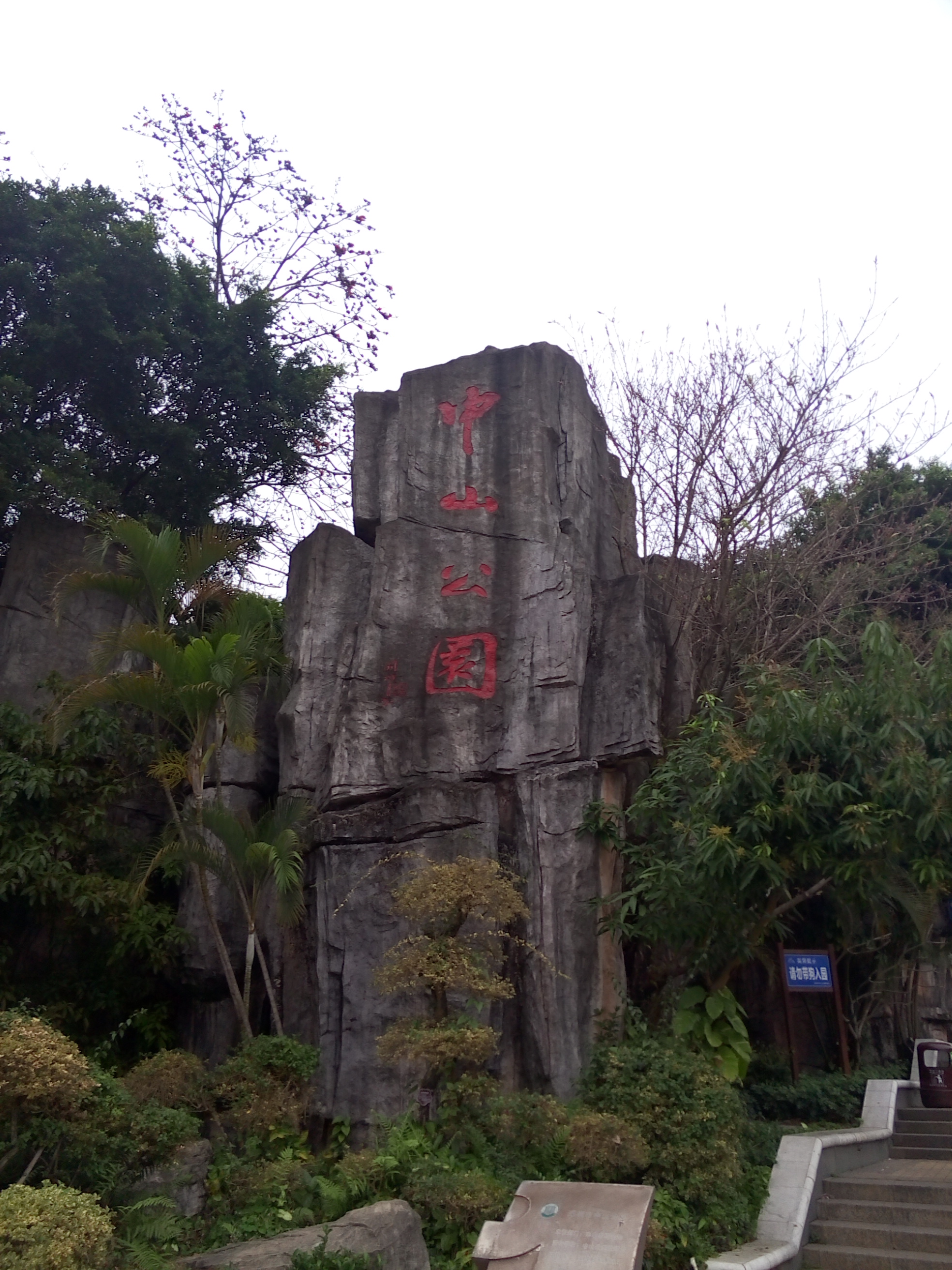
Zhongshan Park

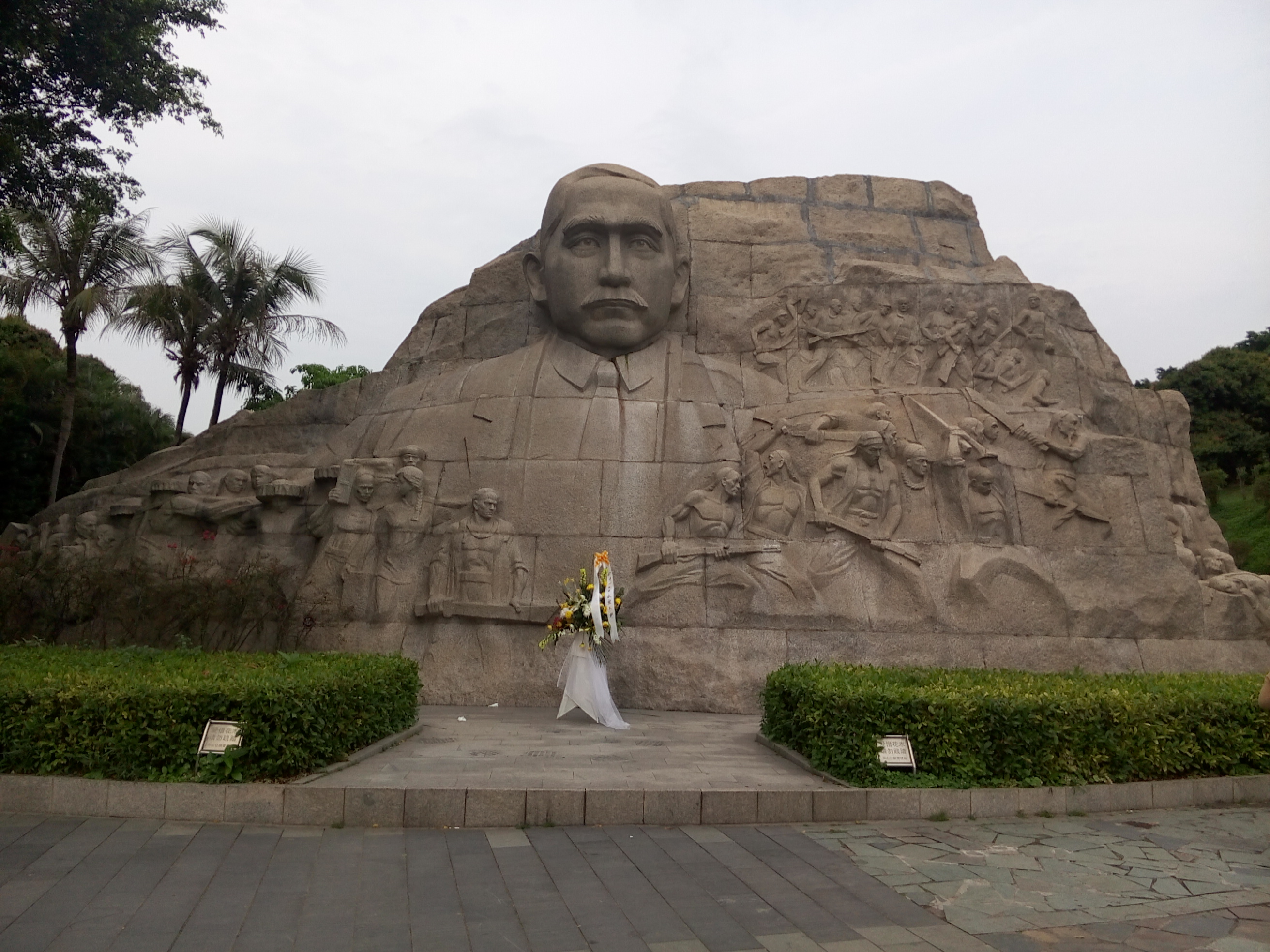
Carving of Sun Yat-Sen in Zhongshan Park

Zhongshan Park (Chinese: 中山公园) is a public urban park in Nanshan, Shenzhen, China. Built in 1925 and subsequently named after Sun Yat-Sen (also known as Sūn Zhōngshān), the first president of the Republic of China, it is the oldest surviving park in Shenzhen.

A section of the northern city walls of Nantou dating back to 1394, are preserved within the park. The park was renovated and reopened to the public in 1999. It also features a carving of Sun Yat-Sen, the largest of its kind in the country.

== See also ==
- List of parks in Shenzhen
