= Honghu Park =

Park in Shenzhen, China

- 洪湖公园
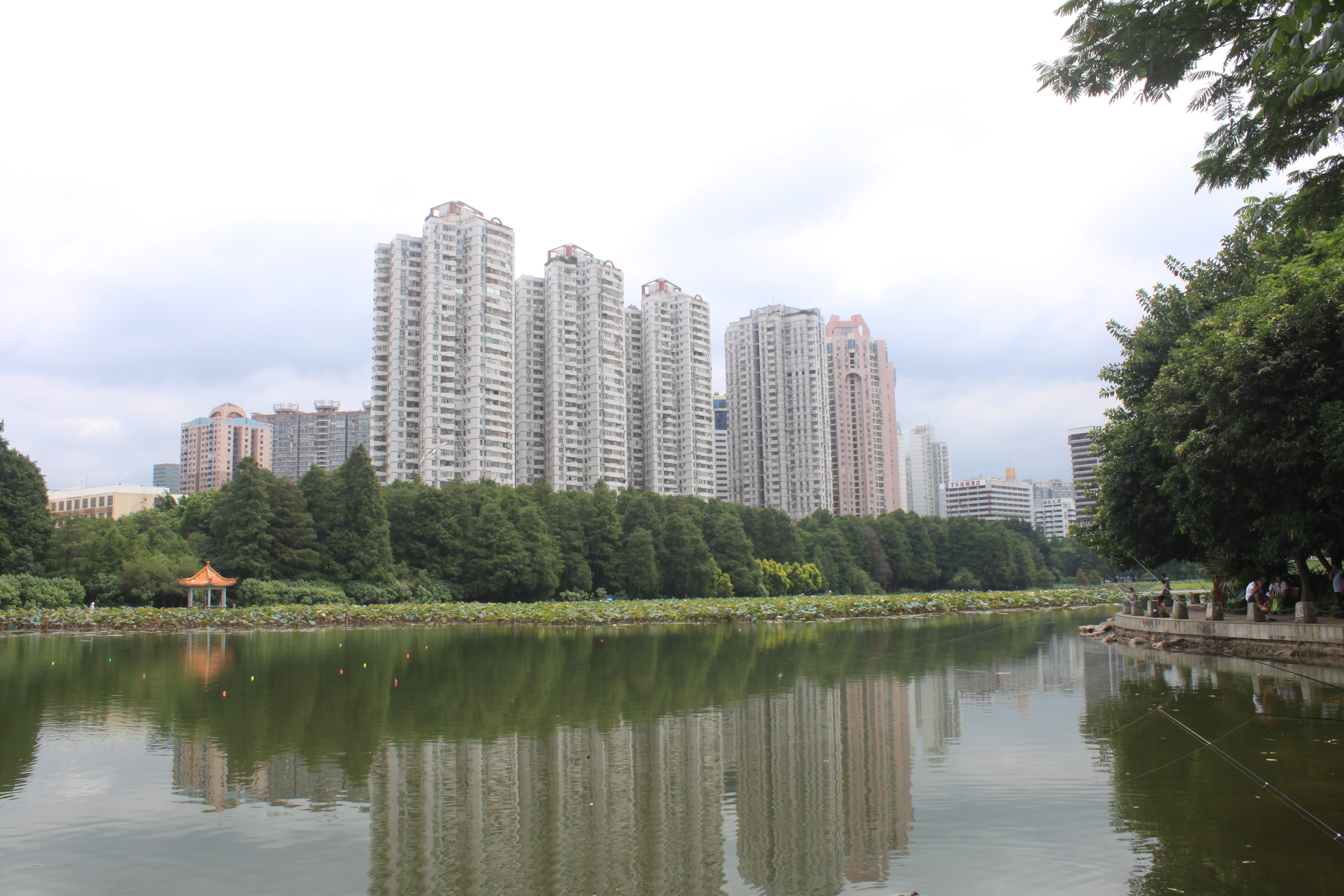
- Lotus pond of Honghu Park.

- Location within Guangdong Location within China
- Type: Public park, urban park
- Location: Luohu District, Shenzhen, Guangdong, China
- Coordinates: 22°34′31″N 114°07′46″E
- Area: 591,500-square-metre (6,367,000 sq ft)
- Created: 1984
- Operator: Shenzhen government
- Status: Open all year

Honghu Park (simplified Chinese: 洪湖公园; traditional Chinese: 洪湖公園; pinyin: Hónghú Gōngyuán) is a public, urban park in Luohu District, Shenzhen, Guangdong, China. Located in Luohu District, Honghu Park is bordered by Sungang Bridge on the South, Honghu West Road on the West, Nigang Bridge on the North, and Honghu East Road and Wenjin North Road on the East. It is a comprehensive park of the theme of lotus, with water activities as feature entertainment activities. It covers an area of 591,500-square-metre (6,367,000 sq ft), of which land area of 324,600-square-metre (3,494,000 sq ft), and water area of 266,900-square-metre (2,873,000 sq ft). Honghu Park was officially opened to the public in 1984. Established in September 1984, Honghu Park is a multifunctional botanical garden and scenic spot integrating scientific research, lotus species collection and display as well as tourism.

== Features ==
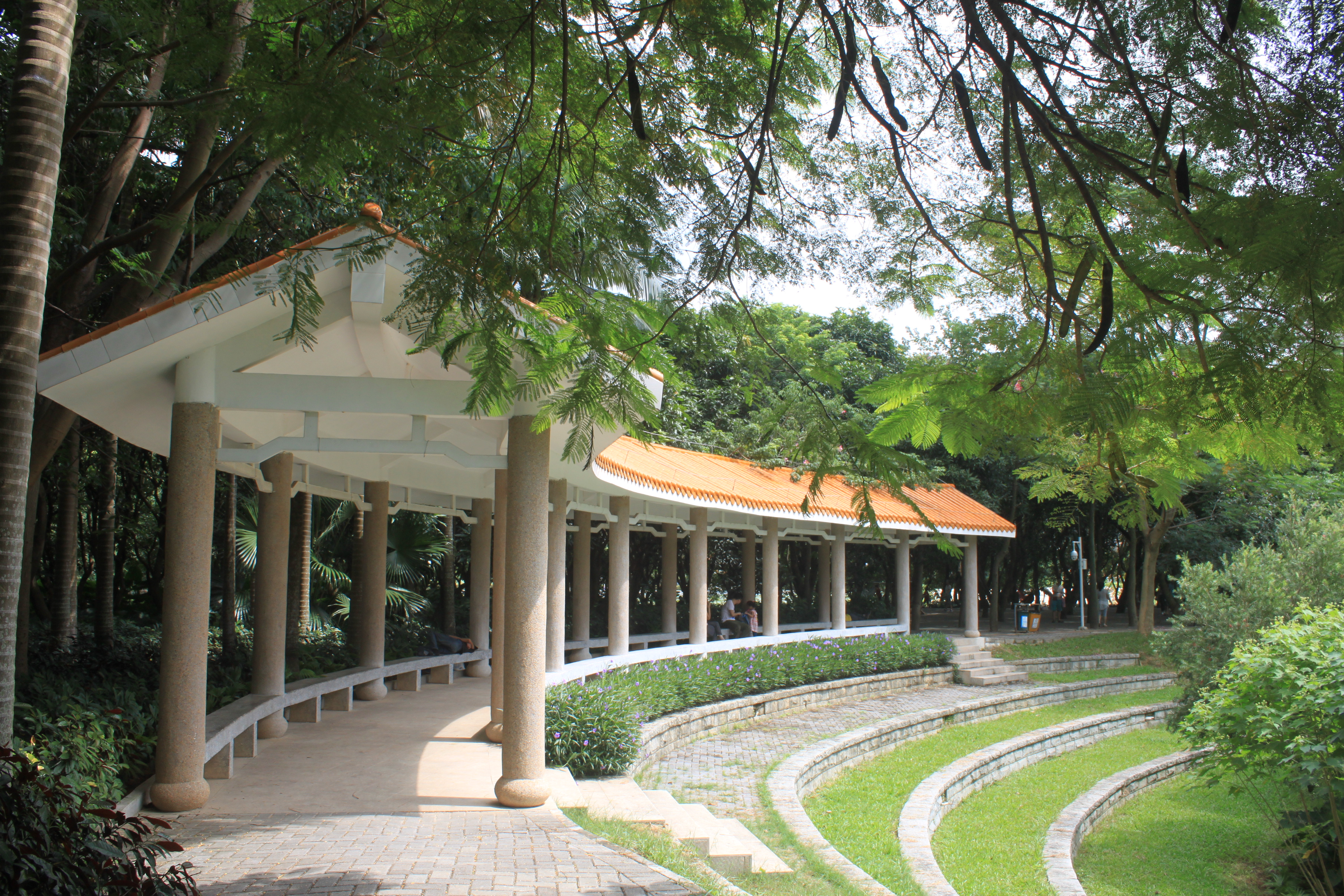
A Huilang at Honghu Park.

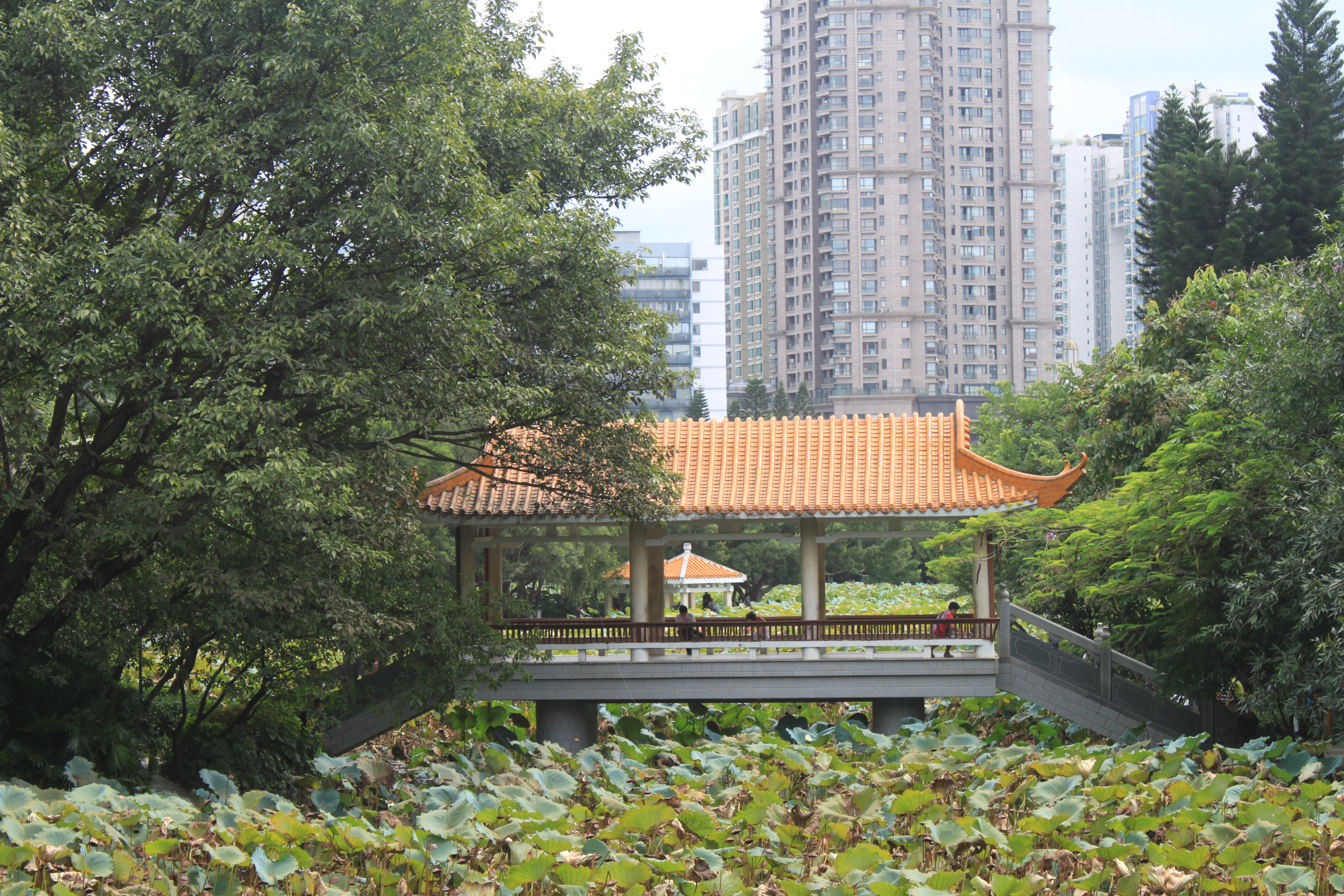
A bridge at Honghu Park.

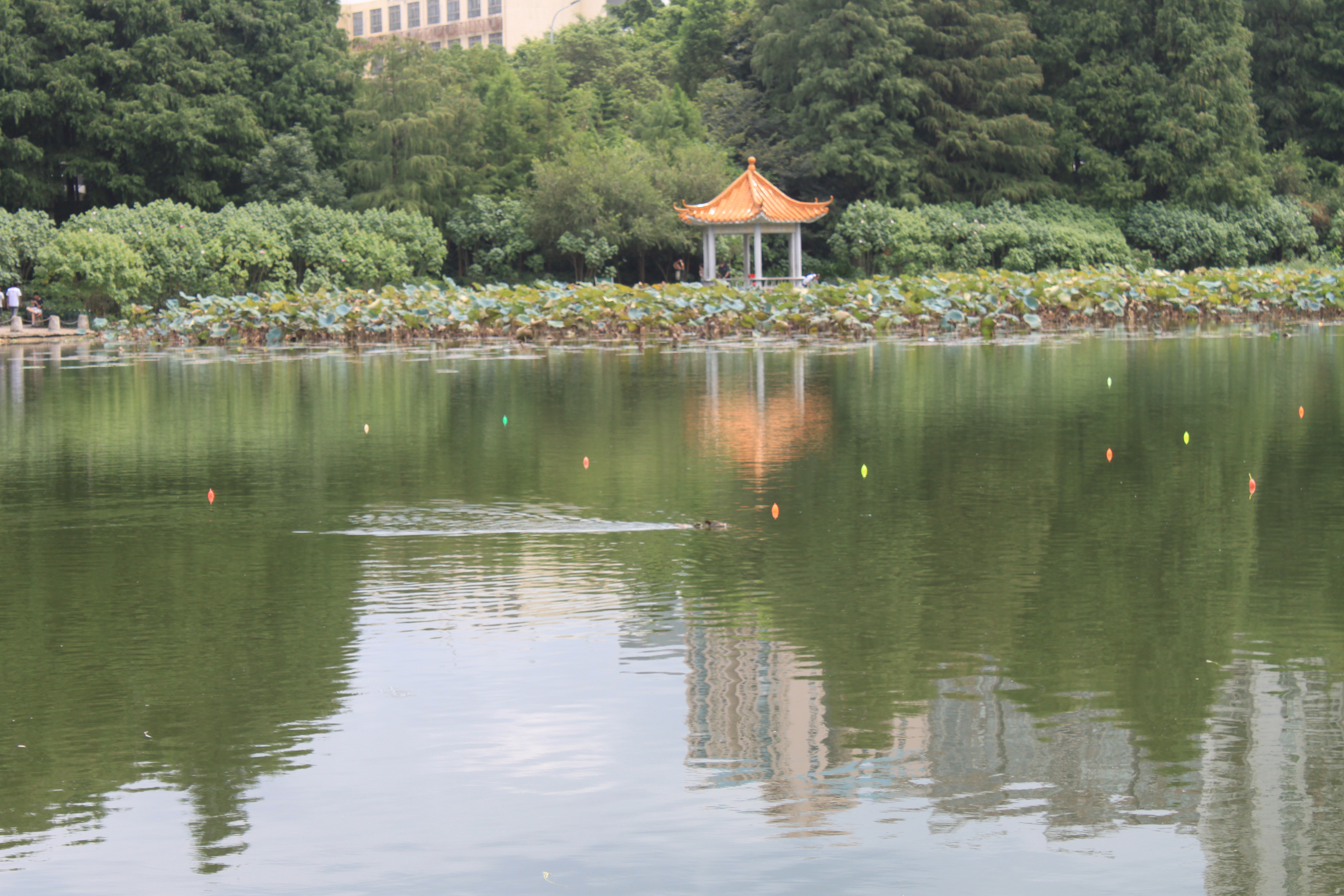
A little water bird is looking for food.

=== Bridges ===
- Duyi Bridge (渡逸桥)
- Furong Bridge (芙蓉桥)
- Liuxi Bridge (流溪桥)
- Nongyue Bridge (弄月桥)
- Ouduan Bridge (藕断桥)
- Qinglian Bridge (清莲桥)
- Yinfeng Bridge (吟风桥)

=== Ponds ===
- Yingri Pond (映日潭)

=== Islands ===
- Dongling Island (东灵岛)
- Hexian Island (荷仙岛)
- Xixiu Island (西秀岛)

=== Pavilions ===
- Chenxi Pavilion (晨曦亭)
- Furong Pavilion (芙蓉亭)
- Hehan Pavilion (荷翰亭)
- Liangyi Pavilion (两宜亭)
- Liuxia Pavilion (流霞亭)

=== Others ===
- Pinhe Garden (品荷园)
- Jushui Terrace (掬水台)
- Lotus Exhibition Hall (荷花展览馆)
- Stele Gallery of Lotus (咏荷碑廊)
- Playground
- Barbecue site
- Swimming Pool

== Transportation ==
- Take subway Line 7 to get off at Honghu Station. Getting out from Exit D and walk 100-metre (330 ft) to the Park.
- Take bus No. 23, 27, 213, 206, 300, 303, 312, 315 or 357 to Honghu Park Bus Stop.

== Environmental concerns ==
In November 2016, a sewage treatment plant began to build within the park, the environmentalists were concerned that plant will affect the water quality and ecological environment.

== See also ==
- List of parks in Shenzhen
