= East Lake Park, Shenzhen =

Park in Shenzhen, China

East Lake Park
- 东湖公园
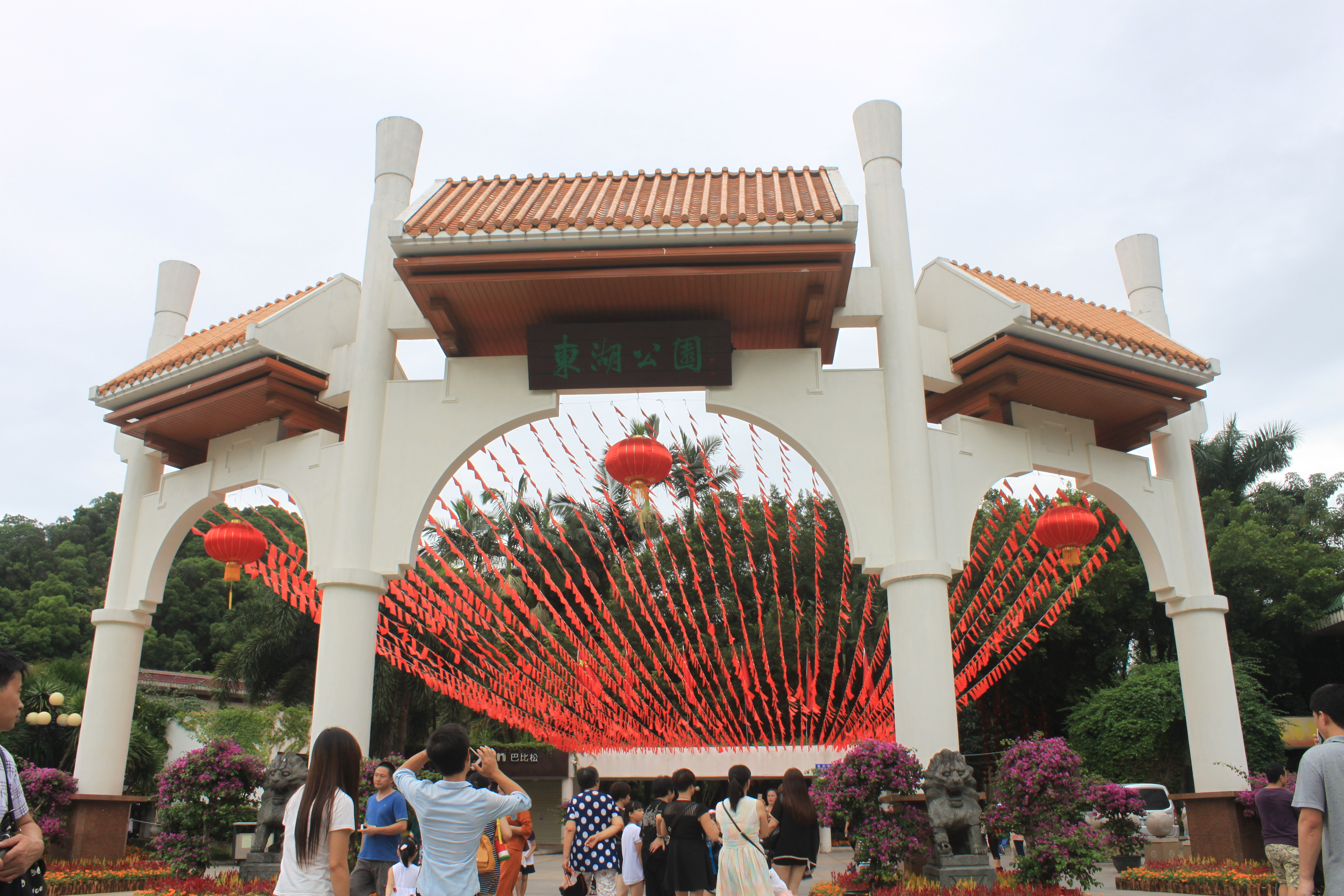
- Entrance of East Lake Park.

- Location within Guangdong Location within China
- Type: Public park, urban park
- Location: Luohu District, Shenzhen, Guangdong, China
- Coordinates: 22°33′53″N 114°8′45″E
- Area: 1,525,900 square metres (16,425,000 sq ft)
- Created: 1961
- Operator: Shenzhen Municipal People’s Government
- Status: Open all year

Chinese name
- Traditional Chinese: 東湖公園
- Simplified Chinese: 东湖公园
Transcriptions
Standard Mandarin
- Hanyu Pinyin: Dōnghú Gōngyuán

East Lake Park (Chinese: 东湖公园), also known as Donghu Park, is a public urban park in Shenzhen, Guangdong, China. The park is located in Luohu District, with Mount Wutong standing in the east, Yanhe Road in the west, Shensha Road in the south, Aiguo Road in the north, covering an area of 1,525,900 square metres (16,425,000 sq ft). The park was opened in 1966, incorporating recreational activities and tourism. In April 1991 the park was designated as a "provincial-level scenic spot" by the Guangdong Provincial People's Government.

== History ==
Construction of the East Lake Park started in 1961 and was known as Reservoir Park on its completion (Chinese: 水库公园; pinyin: Shuǐkù Gōngyuán), and was officially opened to the public in 1966.

== Parks ==
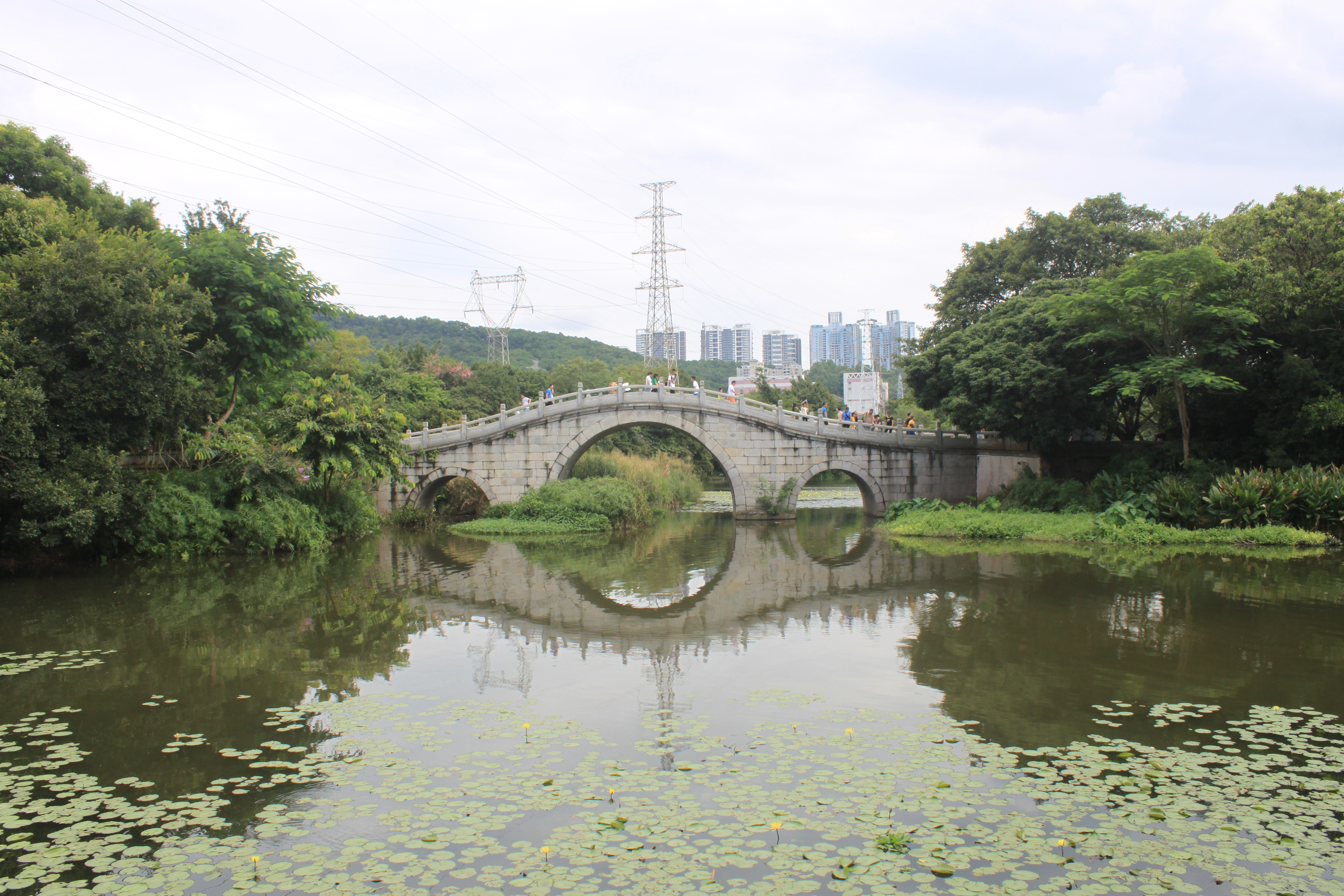
A three-arched bridge in the East Lake Park.

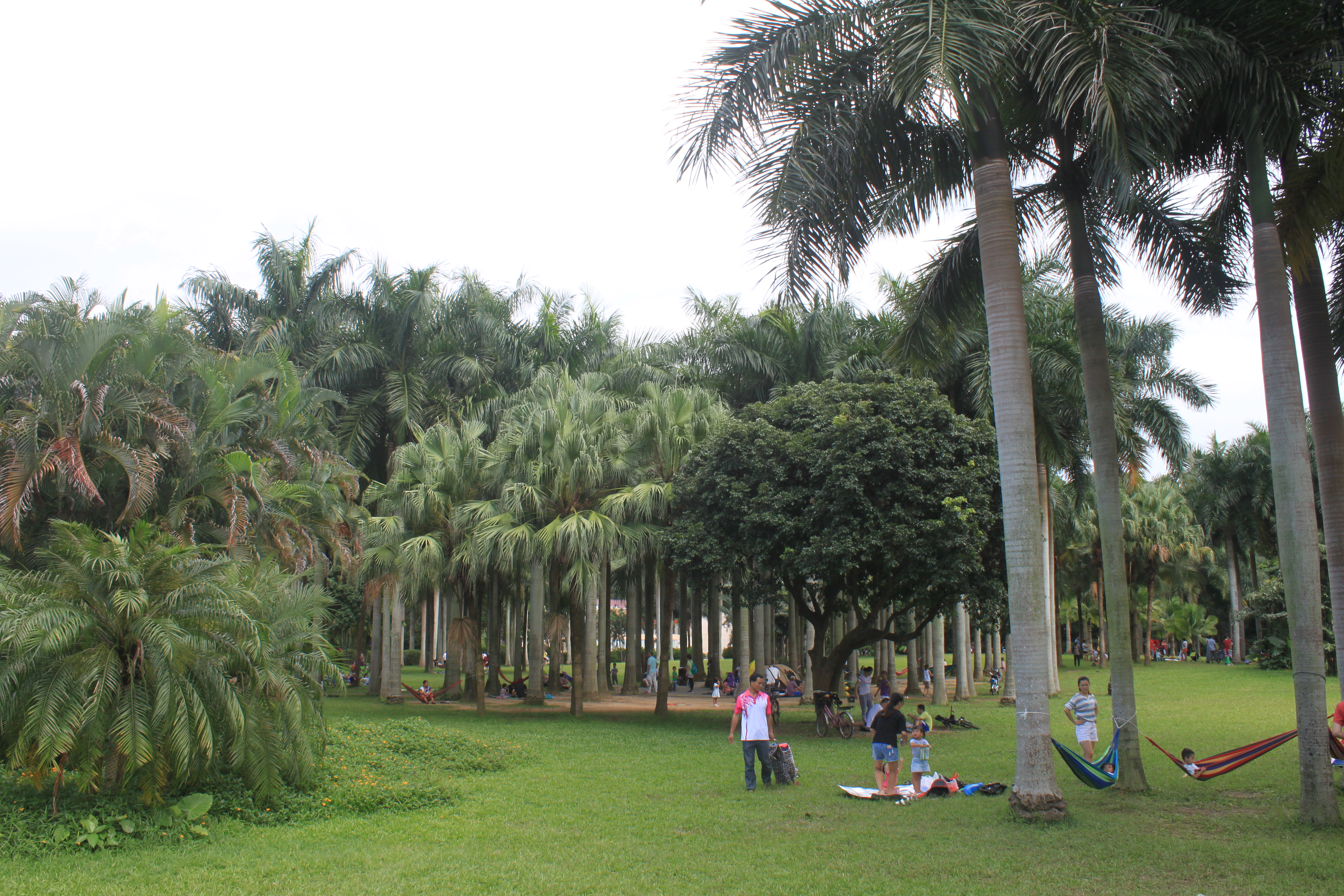
People enjoy the cool under the trees in East Lake Park.

The Garden has more than eleven scenic areas, such as:

- Ornamental Woody Plants Garden (观赏花木园)
- Arboretum (树木园)
- Old and Historical Trees Area (古树区)
- Bonsai world (盆景世界)
- Rhododendron Sculpture Garden (杜鹃雕塑园)
- Landscape Forest (风景林)
- Zoo
- Playground
- Fishing Area
- Tennis Court
- Gateball Area

== Tourist attractions ==
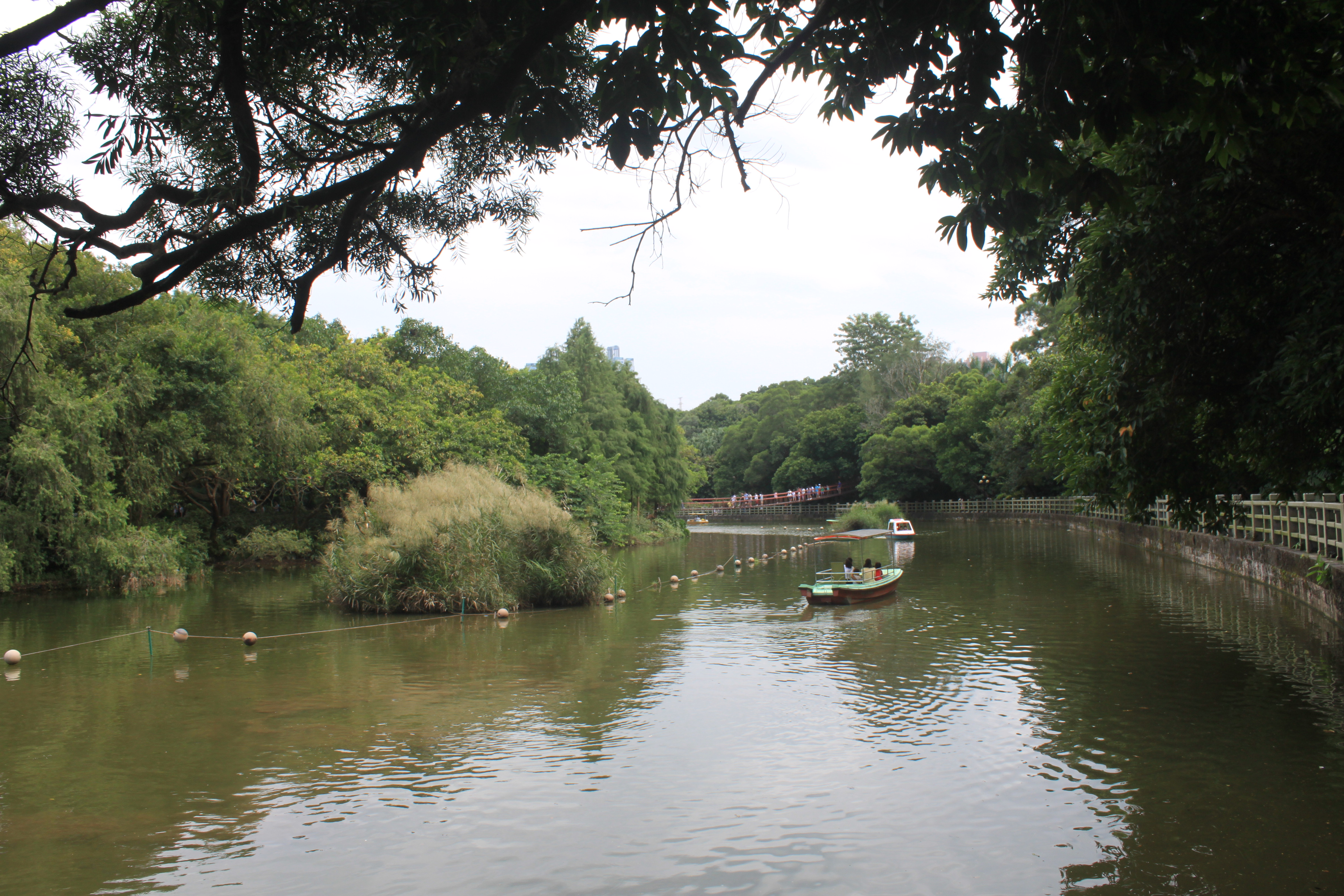
The man-made lake.

The 118,666.7-square-metre (1,277,318 sq ft) man-made lake is divided into two parts. There are three islands in the lake. A stone arch bridge connects the islands.

== Transportation ==
- Take bus No. 3 or 17 to Reservoir Central Station.
- Take bus No. 64 or 320 to East Lake Passenger Station.
- Take bus No. 29, 106, 208, 211, 300, 308, 336, 351, 365 or 372 to Reservoir Station.

== See also ==
- List of parks in Shenzhen
