= Beihu (disambiguation) =

Beihu may refer to the following locations in China:

- Beihu District (北湖区), Chenzhou City, Hunan
- Beihu railway station, a railway station on the Taiwan Railways Administration West Coast line
- Beihu Subdistrict, Jianghan District (北湖街道), Wuhan, Hubei
- Beihu Subdistrict, Nanning (北湖街道), in Xixiangtang District, Nanning, Guangxi
- Beihu Subdistrict, Nangong (北胡街道), Hebei
- Beihu Subdistrict, Chenzhou (北胡街道), Beihu District, Chenzhou City, Hunan
