= East Lake Triangle Pool =

- 东湖三角池 (Chinese)
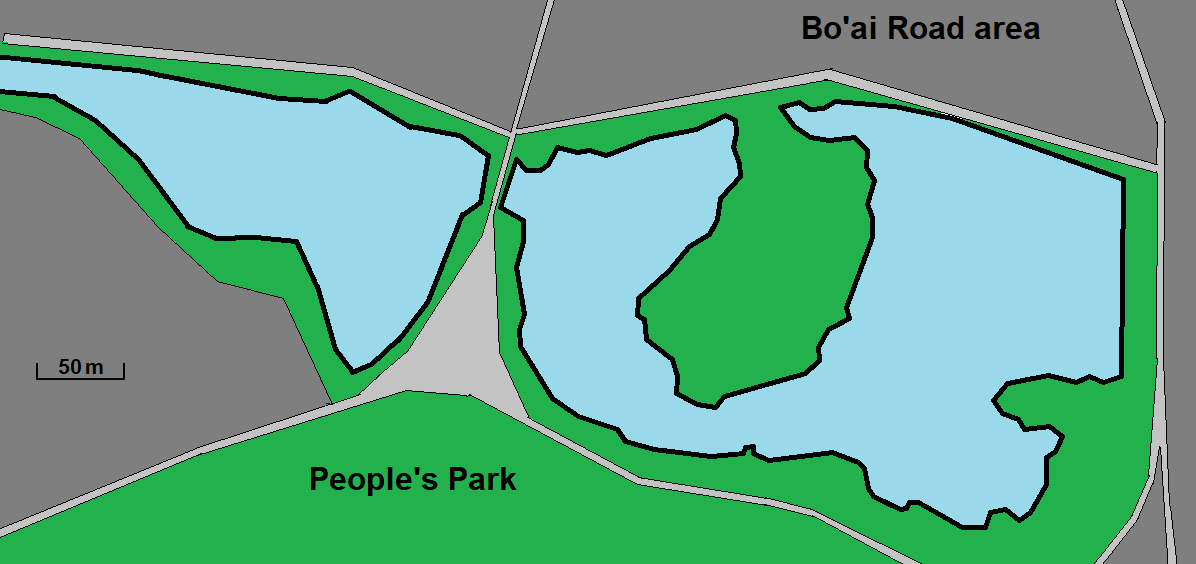

- Location within Hainan
- Location: East Lake area, Haikou, Hainan, China
- Coordinates: 20°02′15″N 110°20′25″E
- Type: Urban lake
- Primary outflows: Haikou Bay
- Max. length: 0.6 kilometres (0.37 mi)
- Max. width: 0.2 kilometres (0.12 mi)

East Lake Triangle Pool (Chinese: 东湖三角池), commonly known as East Lake, is a set of two small lakes in the East Lake area of Haikou, Hainan, China. It is located at the south-west corner of the Bo'ai Road area and at the north side of People's Park.

== Description ==
The two lakes are divided by a tree-lined walkway with a bridge at the north end. The north end of the bridge, where it meets the northern boundary, East Lake Road, is considered to be the north gate of People's Park. The eastern boundary of the lakes is Bo'ai South Road, the main northbound entry into the Bo'ai Road area.

The eastern lake, the bigger of the two, has a peninsula connecting to the land on the north side. It occupies a large part of the eastern lake. The southern end of this peninsula connects to the south shore with a footbridge. For at least ten years prior to 2018, this peninsula was essentially a city rubbish depot and mostly unused building.

The western lake narrows at its western end, goes under a small footbridge, and then connects to one of Haikou's many drainage canals, eventually discharging into a lagoon at the east side of Evergreen Park, then into Haikou Bay.

== Renovation ==
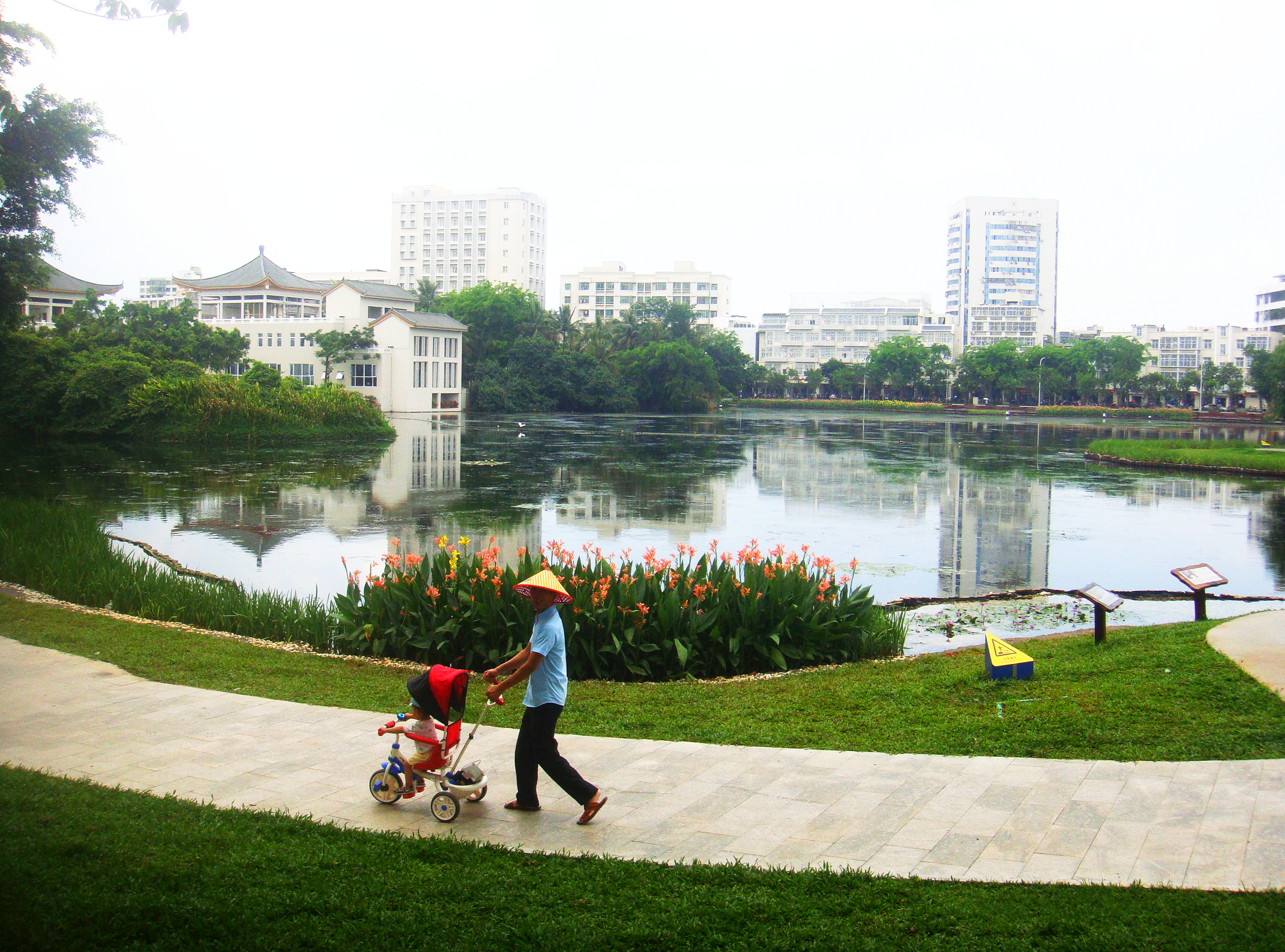
East Lake after the 2018 renovation, viewed from the southeast corner looking north. On the left is the building on the peninsula. The water body is the easternmost of the two lakes.

Between November 15, 2017 and March 31, 2018, the entire East Lake area was renovated. This included the lakes and green areas surrounding them, and renovating the buildings along the roads surrounding the lake.

The peninsula's rubbish depot was removed and the building put back into service. The peninsula and all the pathways around the lakes were completely renovated, with night lighting installed along with new stone paths and landscaping. The lakes themselves were cleaned up with water treatment equipment installed and water features placed at the banks. A footbridge now connects the peninsula to the south bank. East Lake is now a visitor attraction.
