= East Lake, Missouri =

Extinct hamlet in Missouri, U.S.

Coordinates: 36°48′25″N 89°31′13″W

East Lake is an extinct town in New Madrid County, in the U.S. state of Missouri. The GNIS classifies it as a populated place.

A post office called Eastlake was established in 1892, and remained in operation until 1905. The community was so named on account of a nearby (former) lake which lied in the eastern section of New Madrid County.
