= Eastlake (surname) =

Eastlake is a surname. It originated as an English locational surname for someone living in or around a place called Eastlake or East Lake. One likely origin for the name is near Broadwoodwidger, in Devon. Notable people with the surname include:

- Charles Eastlake (1836–1906), British architect and furniture designer
- Charles Eastlake Smith (1850–1917), English amateur soccer player
- Sir Charles Lock Eastlake (1793–1865), 19th-century English painter
- Cyril Eastlake (1930–2007), New Zealand rugby league footballer
- Darrell Eastlake (1942–2018), Australian sports commentator
- Elizabeth Eastlake (1809–1893), British art critic and art historian
- Frederick Warrington Eastlake (1856–1905), American linguist and teacher
- Gladys Shirley Eastlake Smith (1883–1941), British tennis player
- Mary Alexandra Bell Eastlake (1864–1951), Canadian painter
- William Clark Eastlake (1834–1887), American dentist
- William Eastlake (1917–1997), American writer
