= Eastlake High School =

Eastlake High School may refer to:

- Eastlake High School (California)
- Eastlake High School (Texas)
- Eastlake High School (Washington)

== See also ==
- East Lake High School
