= Nanshan, Shenzhen =

Nanshan 南山区
- District
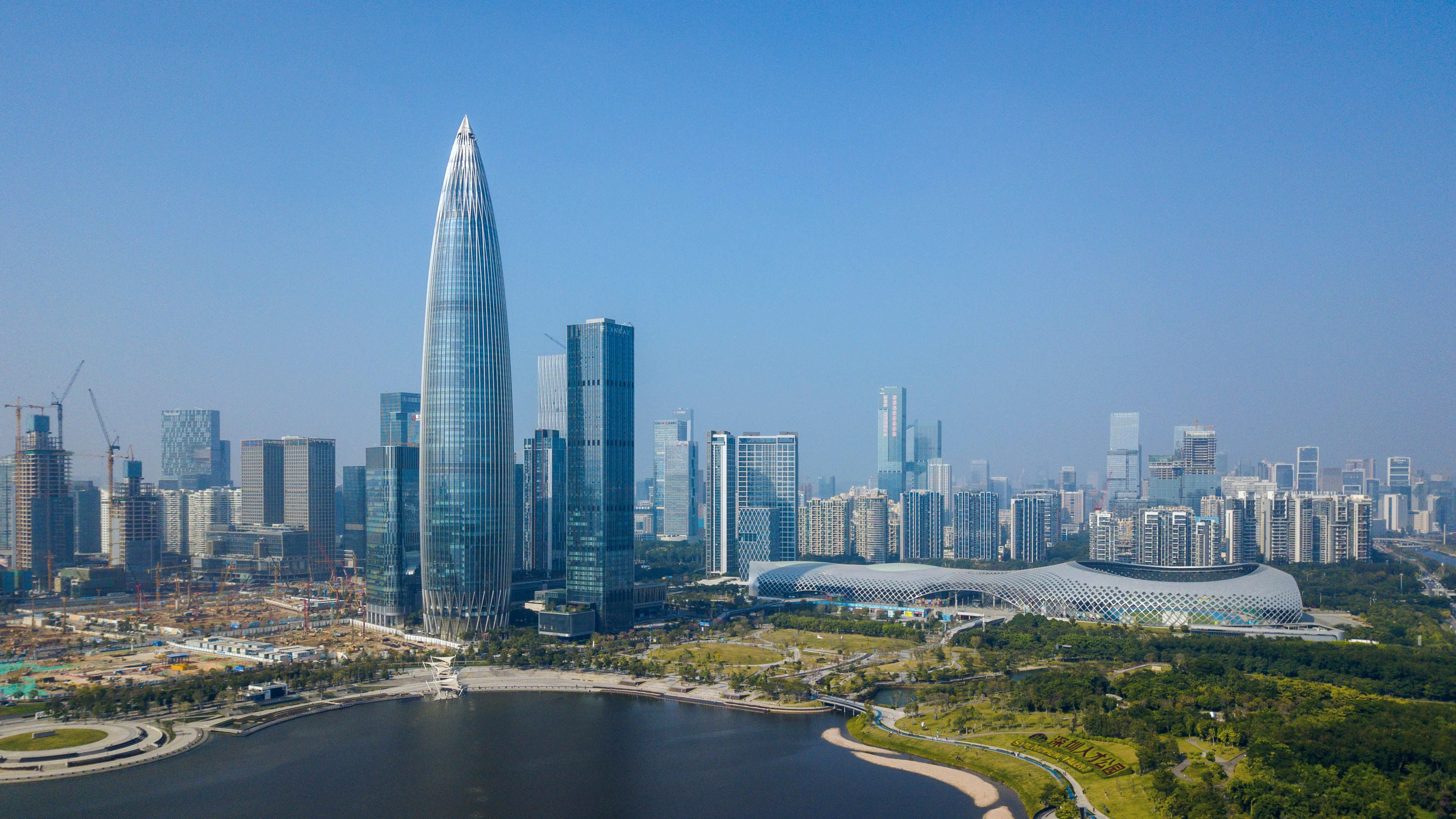
- Shenzhen Bay with China Resources Headquarters on the left and Shenzhen Bay Sports Center on the right.

- Nanshan District (the lower left, highlighted in green) in Shenzhen
- Coordinates: 22°32′48″N 113°55′35″E
- Country: People's Republic of China
- Province: Guangdong
- Sub-provincial division: Shenzhen

Area
  - Total: 182 km^{2} (70 sq mi)

Population (2020)
  - Total: 1,795,826
  - Density: 9,870/km^{2} (25,600/sq mi)
- Time zone: UTC+08:00 (China Standard)
- Area code: 0755
- GDP (nominal): 2025
- Total: CNY 1,000 billion (US$143.7 billion)
- Per capita: CNY 540,000 (US$77,142)
- Website: www.szns.gov.cn

Nanshan District (Chinese: 南山区; pinyin: Nánshān Qū; Cantonese Jyutping: Naam4 Saan1 Keoi1) is one of the nine districts comprising the city of Shenzhen in Guangdong province, China. It encompasses the southwest area of the Shenzhen Special Economic Zone, with a population of 1.08 million. In 2025, the district of Nanshan's local GDP output exceeded 1,000 billion Chinese Yuan or 143.7 billion US dollars, an economy slightly larger than that of Uzbekistan or Bulgaria. The region has an established tourism industry and is home to several sightseeing locations, as well as multiple seaside parks such as the Shenzhen Bay Park and the Shenzhen Talent Park. Its tallest building is the 393-metre (1,289 ft) China Resources Headquarters.

It is known for being the home of Shenzhen High-Tech Industrial Park, which comprises some of China's largest technology companies and the establishments of well-known international companies, as well as being the nation's richest district of a city-level municipality. The district has some of the most expensive neighbourhoods in China in terms of real estate prices.

== Geography ==
Nanshan District has a total area of 182 km^{2} (70 sq mi). The area continued to increase due to large scale land reclamation, especially in Qianhai and Houhai. The district is located to the northwest of Deep Bay, east of the Pearl River entrance. Its northern boundary is Yangtaishan, which divides the district with Baoan, while it is bounded south by Inner Lingding Island and Dachan Island, though the Port of Shekou is the southernmost point on the peninsula. Nanshan is situated about a degree south of the Tropic of Cancer and has a humid subtropical climate. It sits directly north of Yuen Long district of Hong Kong. More than half of the district consist of urban areas. Mountainous areas like Tanglangshan and Yangtaishan to the north and Nanshan Park to the south are largely preserved as forests.

At 587 metres (1,926 ft) tall, Yangtaishan has the highest elevation in the district, with Tanglangshan being the second at 430 metres (1,411 ft), and Nanshan, third, at 336 metres (1,102 ft). The district has a total coastline of 55.18 kilometres (34.29 mi).

== History ==
The history of Nanshan is long. In 331, the Jin government set County of Dongguan (東官) and County of Bao'an. These counties' capitals are in Nantou. Before that, in 265, Wu set Ministry of Salt (司鹽都尉)to control the salt production in South China Sea.

In July 1979, the first canon to break the mountain (开山“第一炮”) happened in Shekou.

== Demographics ==
In 2021 the population in Nanshan is 1,795,826.

== Administrative divisions ==
Nanshan District is organized into the following subdistricts.

Name	Chinese	Hanyu Pinyin	Canton Romanization	Population (2010)	Area (km^{2})
Nantou Subdistrict	南头街道	Nántóu Jiēdào	nam4 teo4 gai1 dou6	163,237	16.80
Nanshan Subdistrict	南山街道	Nánshān Jiēdào	nam4 san1 gai1 dou6	152,312	23.90
Shahe Subdistrict	沙河街道	Shāhé Jiēdào	sa1 ho4 gai1 dou6	121,350	22.32
Xili Subdistrict	西丽街道	Xīlì Jiēdào	sei1 lei6 gai1 dou6	187,832	49.16
Shekou Subdistrict	蛇口街道	Shékǒu Jiēdào	sé4 heo2 gai1 dou6	87,304	12.29
Zhaoshang Subdistrict	招商街道	Zhāoshāng Jiēdào	jiu1 sêng1 gai1 dou6	79,650	18.36
Yuehai Subdistrict	粤海街道	Yuèhǎi Jiēdào	yud6 hoi2 gai1 dou6	157,807	14.40
Taoyuan Subdistrict	桃源街道	Táoyuán Jiēdào	tou4 yun4 gai1 dou6	138,853	40.00

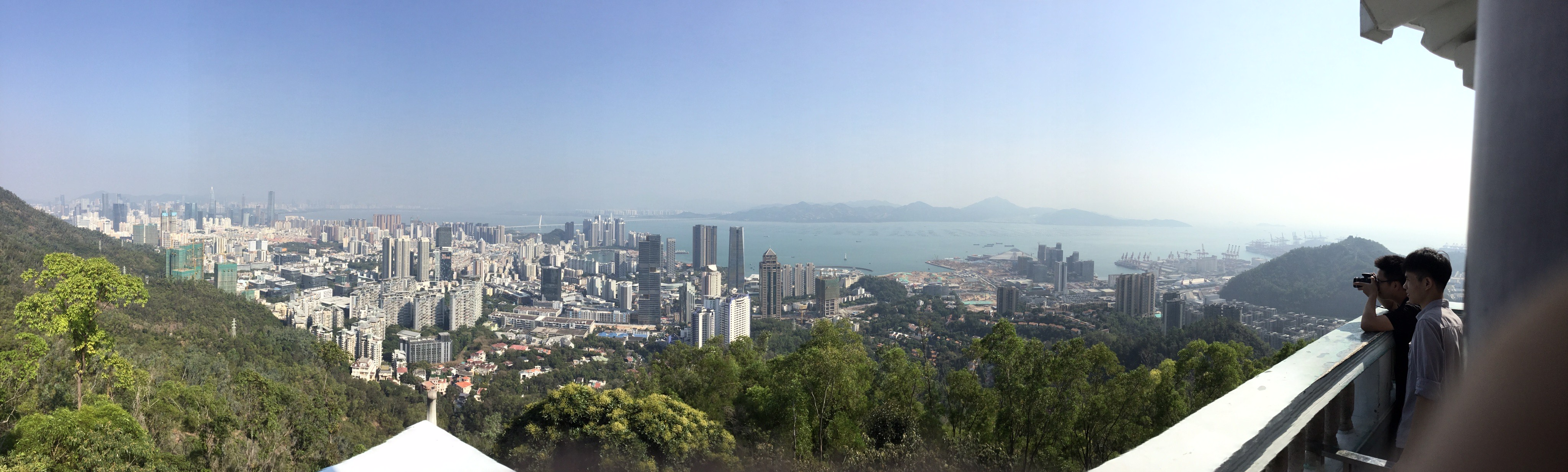
The view of Nanshan from Nanshan Mountain

== Transportation ==
=== Shenzhen Metro ===
Nanshan is currently served by seven metro lines operated by Shenzhen Metro:

- Line 1 - OCT, Window of the World 2, Baishizhou, Hi-Tech Park, Shenzhen University, Taoyuan 12, Daxin, Liyumen, Qianhaiwan 5 11
- Line 2 - Chiwan 5, Shekou Port, Sea World 12, Shuiwan, Dongjiaotou, Wanxia, Haiyue, Dengliang, Houhai 11, Keyuan, Hongshuwan, Window of the World 1, Qiaocheng North
- Line 5 - Chiwan 2, Liwan, Railway Park, Mawan, Qianwan Park, Qianwan 9, Guiwan, Qianhaiwan 1 11, Liuxiandong, Xili 7, University Town, Tanglang, Changlingpi
- Line 7 - Xili Lake, Xili 5, Chaguang, Zhuguang, Longjing, Taoyuancun, Shenyun
- Line 9 - Qianwan 5, Menghai, Litchi Orchards, Nanyou West, Nanyou 12, Nanshan Book Mall, Shenzhen University South, Yuehaimen, High-Tech South, Hongshuwan South 11, Shenwan, Shenzhen Bay Park
- Line 11 - Qianhaiwan 1 5, Nanshan 12, Houhai 2, Hongshuwan South 9
- Line 12 - Zuopaotai East, Taiziwan, Sea World 2, Huaguoshan, Sihai, Nanyou 9, Nanguang, Nanshan 11, Taoyuan 1, Nantou Ancient City, Zhongshan Park, Tongle South

=== Railway stations ===
- Shekou West (蛇口西站)
- Mawan (妈湾站)
- Shenzhen West (深圳西站)
- Xili (西丽站)

=== Container ports ===
- Shekou (蛇口)
- Dongjiaotou (东角头)
- Chiwan (赤湾)
- Mawan (妈湾)
- Qianhai (前海)

=== Maritime transport ===
The Shekou Passenger Terminal offered ferry service to Hong Kong (Hong Kong Island and Hong Kong International Airport), Zhuhai and Macau. The Shekou Cruise Center now serves that role.

Cross-border coaches to and from Hong Kong are also available at Shenzhen Bay Port. The port is located geographically at Shekou, hence all coaches will travel along the Hong Kong-Shenzhen Western Corridor to get to Hong Kong.

== Economy ==
Coolpad, Tencent, ZTE, China Merchants Shekou, Dajiang (DJI), and China Resources (CR), among others, have their headquarters at Hi-Tech Park (科技园), Nanshan.

The South China office of CR Beverage is in on the 10th floor of the Min Tai Building (闽泰大厦) in the district. China Nepstar has its headquarters in the Xinnengyuan Building (新能源大厦) on Nanhai Road, Nanshan District. The headquarters of Evergrande Group are in Nanshan. The drink company Hey Tea has its headquarters in the Aerospace Science And Technology Square (航天科技广场). The department store chain Ren Ren Le has its headquarters in Nanshan District.

In 2015, Guangdong Free Trade Area was established in Qianhai-Shekou.

== Education ==
=== Universities ===
Eight of Shenzhen's eleven full-time universities are located in Nanshan:

- Shenzhen University
- Shenzhen Polytechnic
- University Town of Shenzhen
  - Tsinghua Shenzhen International Graduate School, Tsinghua University
  - Peking University Shenzhen Graduate School, Peking University
  - Harbin Institute of Technology, Shenzhen
  - Shenzhen Institute of Advanced Integration Technology, Chinese Academy of Sciences
  - Southern University of Science and Technology
  - Shenzhen University (Lihu Campus)
  - Georgia Tech Tianjin University Shenzhen Institute
- Shenzhen Virtual University Park

=== Primary and secondary schools ===
==== Government secondary schools ====
Some are governed by the Shenzhen municipal government. Those include:

- Shenzhen Experimental School

Some are governed by the Nanshan District government. Those include:

- Nanshan Middle School Attached to Beijing Normal University (北京师范大学南山附属学校中学部)
- Shenzhen Bolun Vocational and Technical School (深圳市博伦职业技术学校)
- Shenzhen Nanshan Experimental Education Group (深圳市南山实验教育集团)
  - Nanhai Middle School (南海中学)
  - Qilin Middle School (麒麟中学)
- Shenzhen Nanshan Foreign Language School (Group) (深圳市南山外国语学校（集团）/深圳南山外國語學校)
  - Binhai Middle School (滨海中学)
  - Gaoxin Middle School (高新中学)
  - Taoyuan Middle School (桃源中学)
  - High School (高级中学)
- Second Foreign Language School of Nanshan (Group) (深圳市南山区第二外国语学校（集团）)
  - Xuefu Middle School (学府中学)
- Shenzhen Shekou Yucai Education Group (深圳市蛇口育才教育集团)
  - Yucai High School
  - Yucai No. 2 Middle School
  - Yucai No. 3 Middle School
- Shenzhen Nanshan OCT High School 深圳市南山区华侨城中学/華僑城中學
  - OCT Campus (侨城初中部)
  - Shenwan Campus (深圳湾部)
- Shenzhen Nantou High School (深圳市南头中学/南頭中學)

Other:

- Lixiang Middle School 荔香中學/荔香中学
- Shekou School, merged from Shekou Middle School
- Shenzhen Nanshan Bilingual School, a Cambridge International Center (CIC) Middle School

==== International and private schools ====
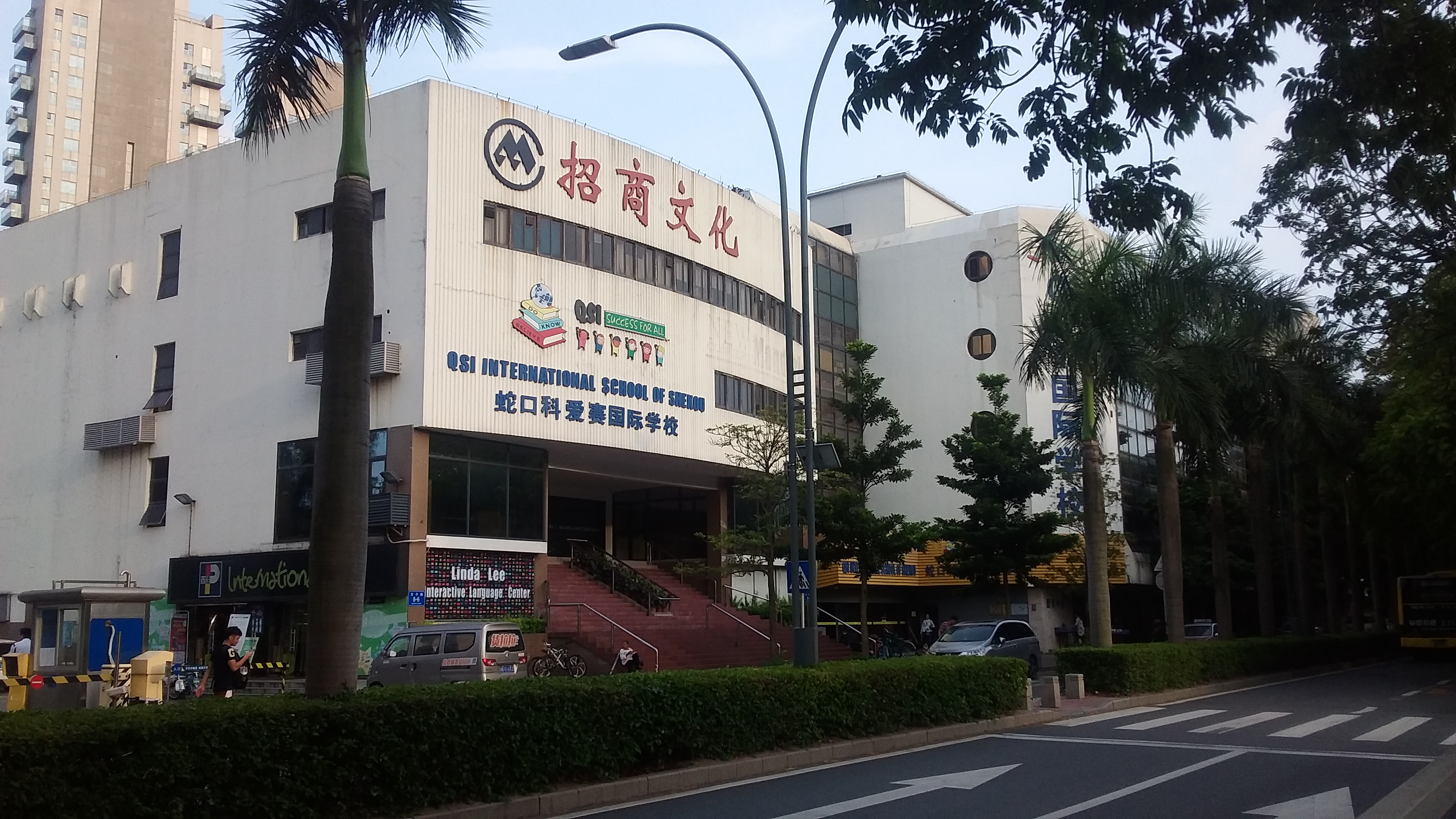
QSI International School of Shenzhen

There are more than four Anglophone international schools and private schools in Nanshan. Several of these high schools offer International Baccalaureate curriculum, or University of Cambridge International A-Level, or North American style curricula, with English as the main language of instruction. There are also Japanese and South Korean-style schools.

- The International School of Nanshan Shenzhen
- Shenzhen Nanshan Chinese International College (formerly Nanshan Bilingual School/Baishizhou Bilingual School)
- Shekou International School
- QSI International School of Shekou.
- Shenzhen American International School
- BASIS international school of shenzhen
- Shen Wai International school

International K-12 schools include:

- KIS Korean International School of Shenzhen (Korean section and English elementary section)

International 1-9 schools include:

- Shenzhen Japanese School

=== Supplementary schools ===
Shenzhen Saturday School (深・(ｼﾝｾﾝ)補習授業校, Shinsen Hoshū Jugyō Kō), a Japanese weekend school, has its office on the 8th floor of the Jinsanjiao Building (金三角大厦) in Baishizhou. Previously it was based in the Ming Wah International Convention Center (simplified Chinese: 明华国际会议中心; traditional Chinese: 明華國際會議中心) in Shekou.

In addition, the Shenzhen Korean Chamber of Commerce and Industry organizes a Korean Saturday school because many Korean students are not studying in Korean-medium schools; the school had about 600 students in 2007. The chamber uses rented space in the OCT Primary School as the Korean weekend school's classroom.

== Gallery ==
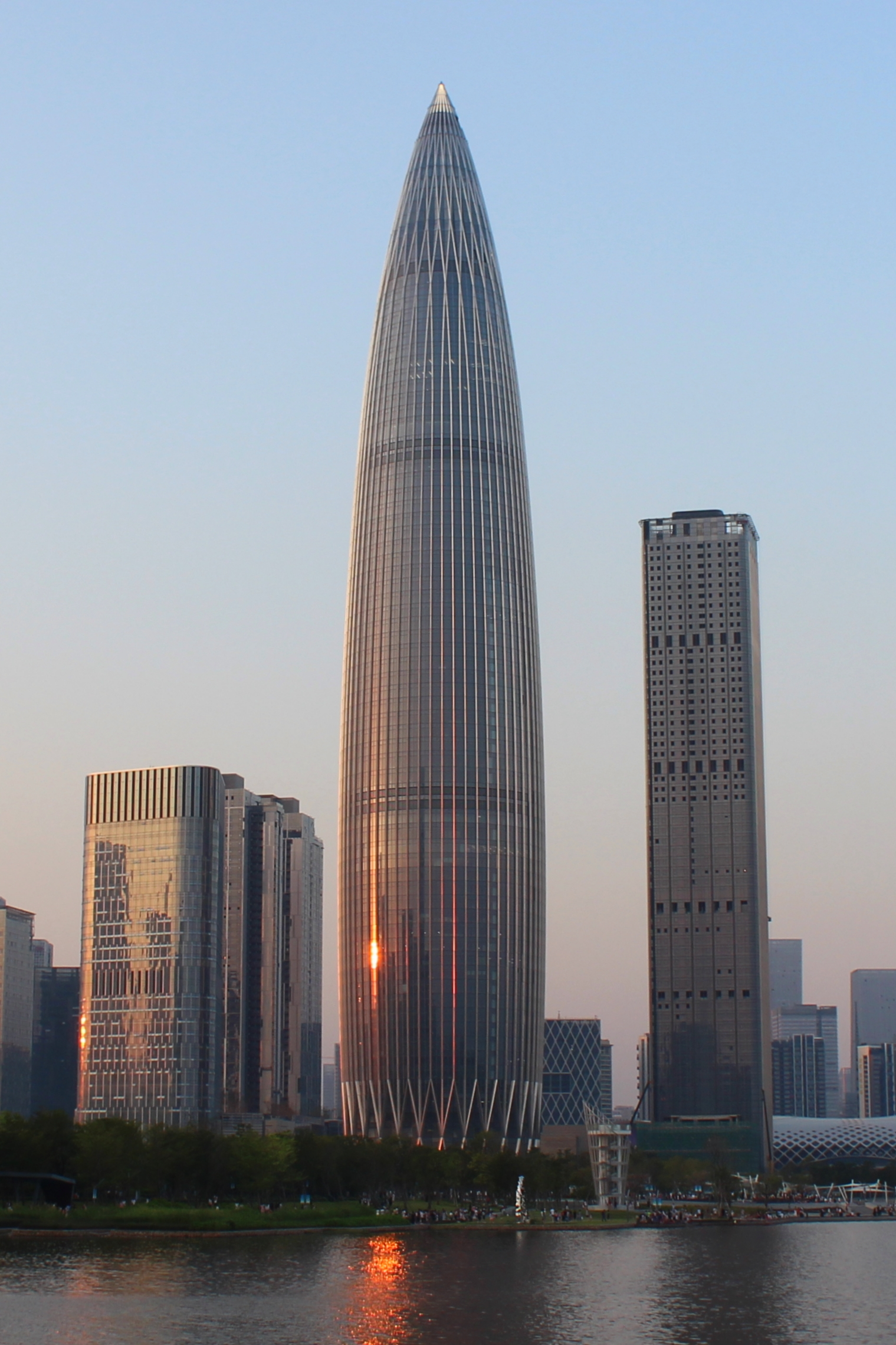
China Resources Headquarters in 2018

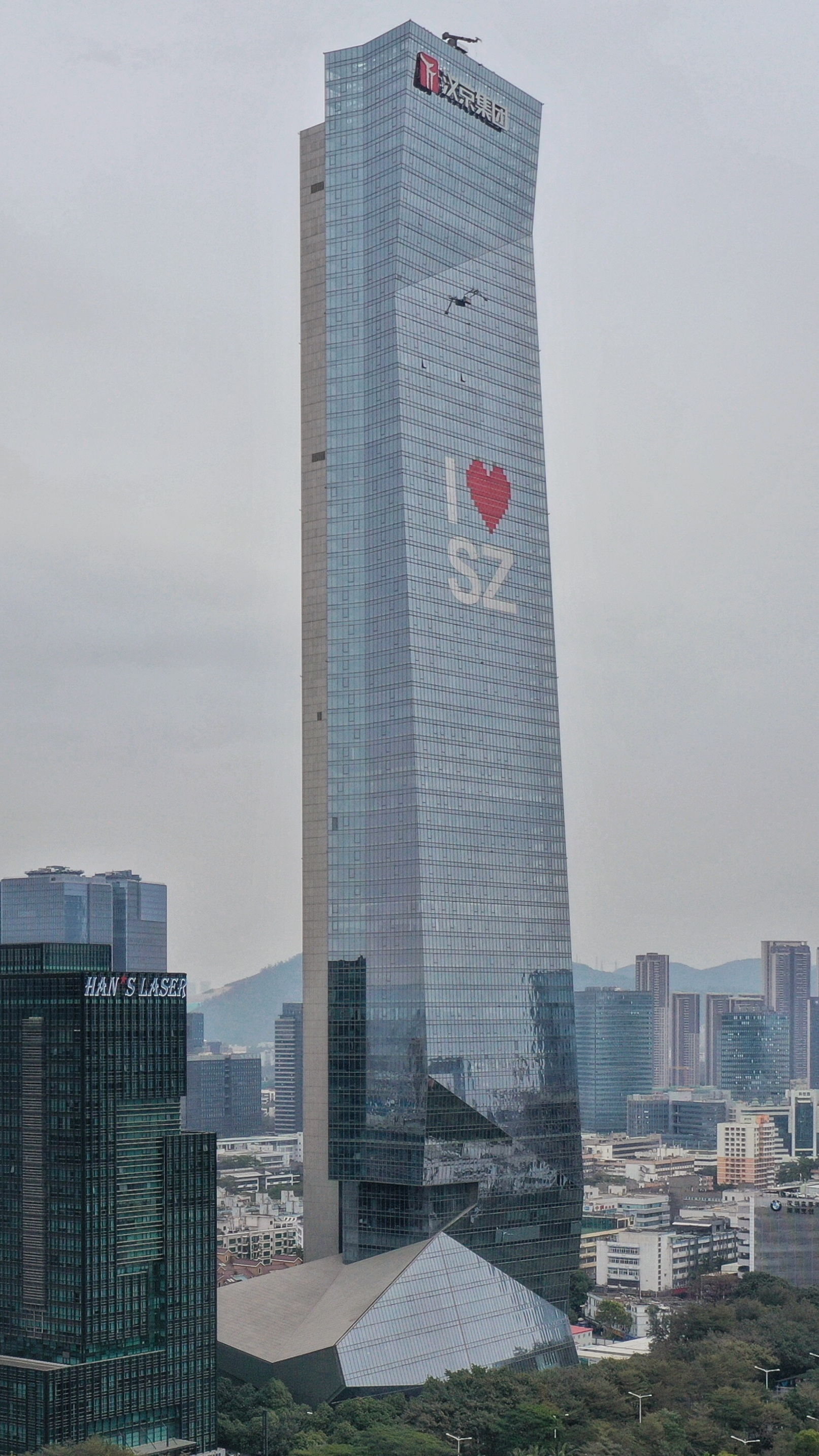
Hanking Center in 2021

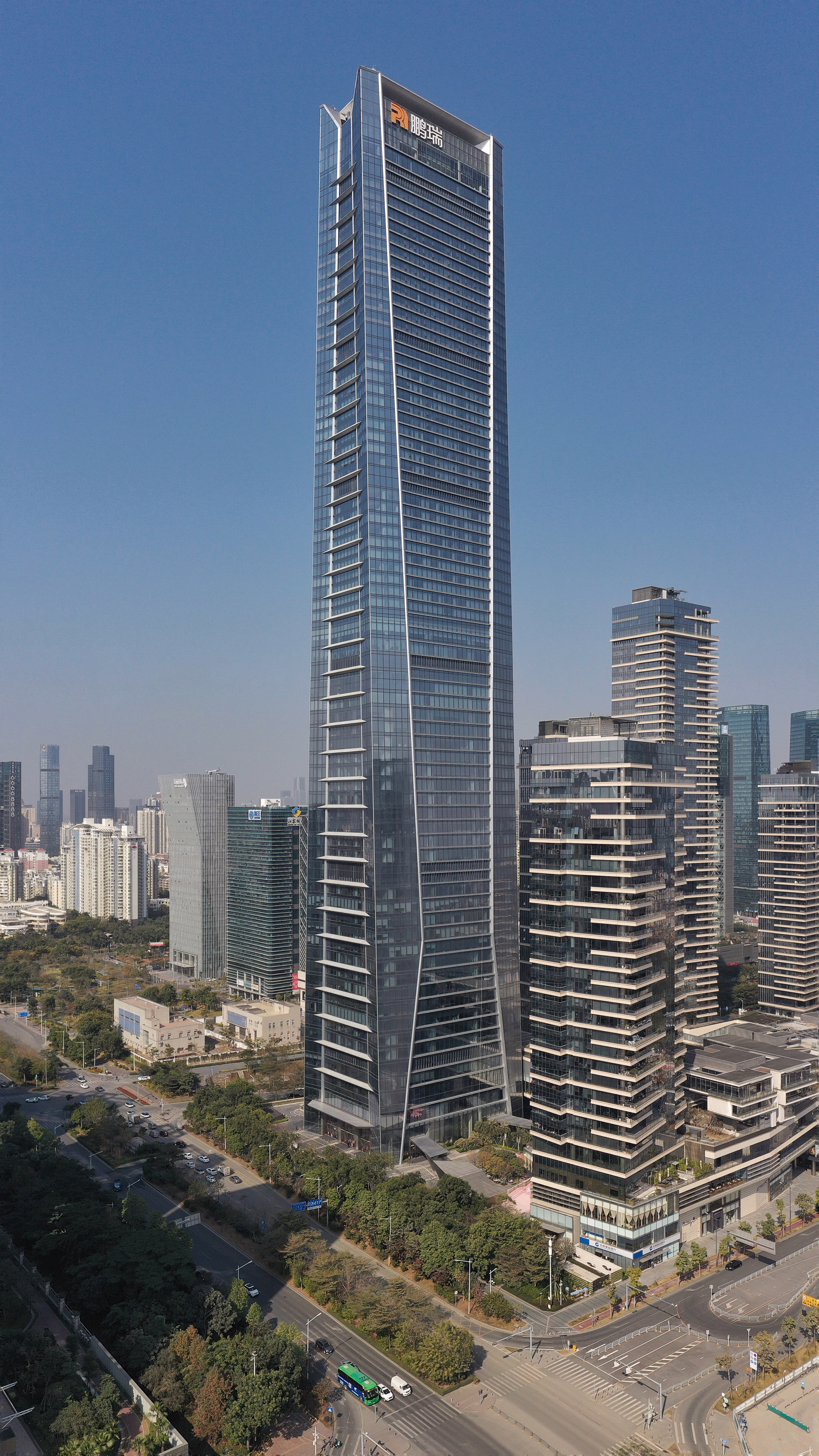
One Shenzhen Bay Tower 7 in 2021

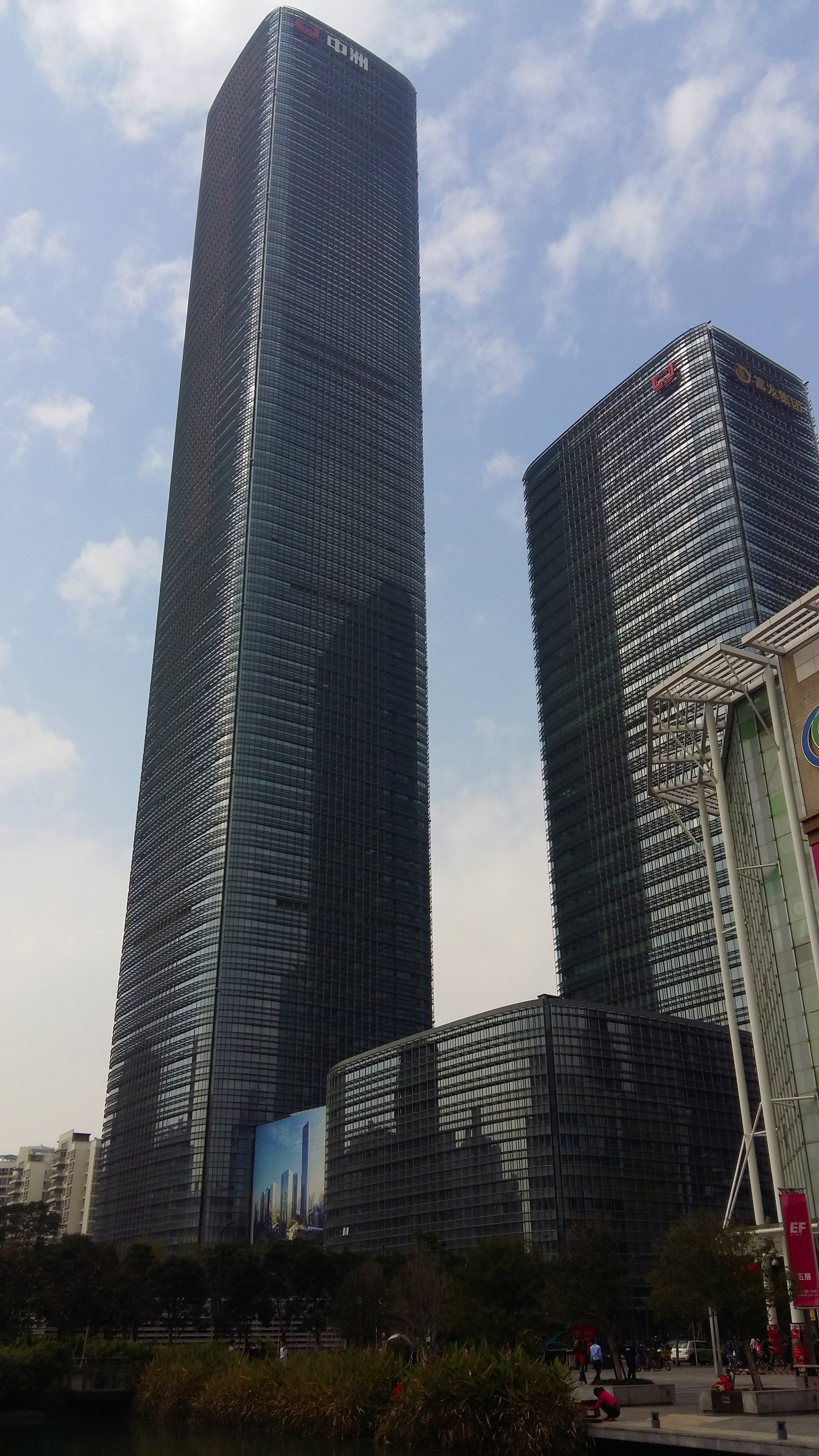
Zhongzhou Holdings Financial Center in 2016

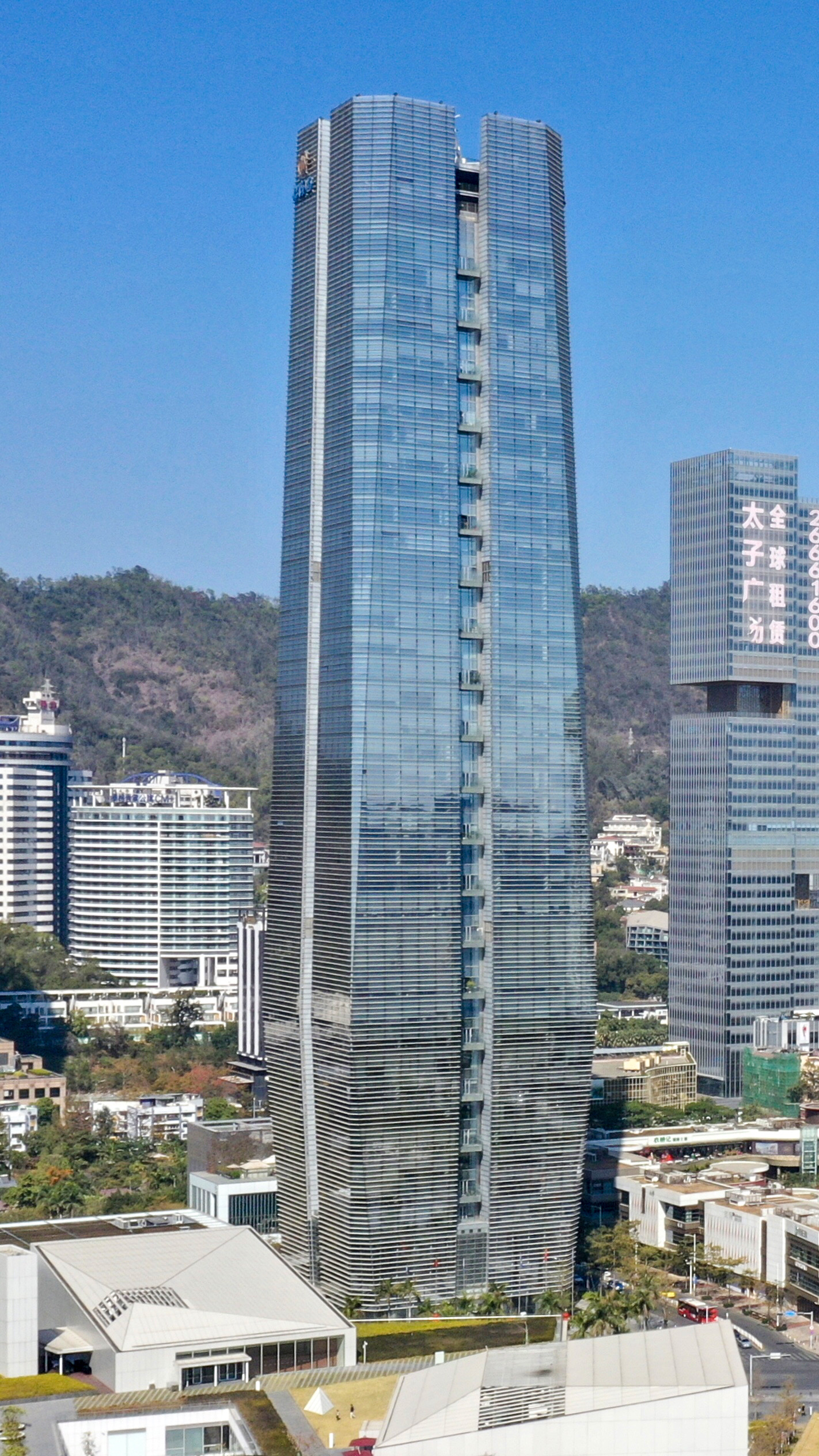
China Merchants Tower in 2021

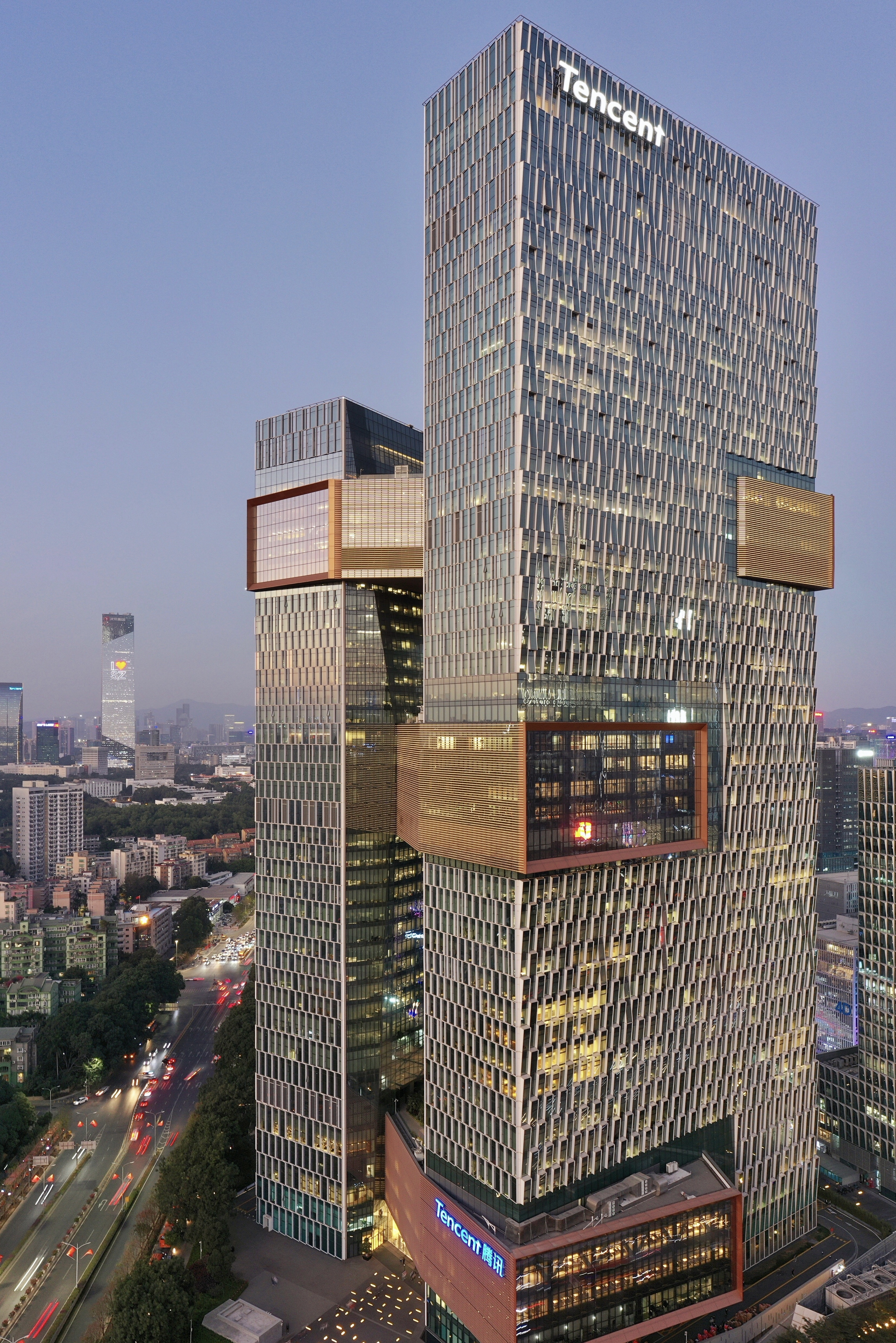
Tencent Headquarters.

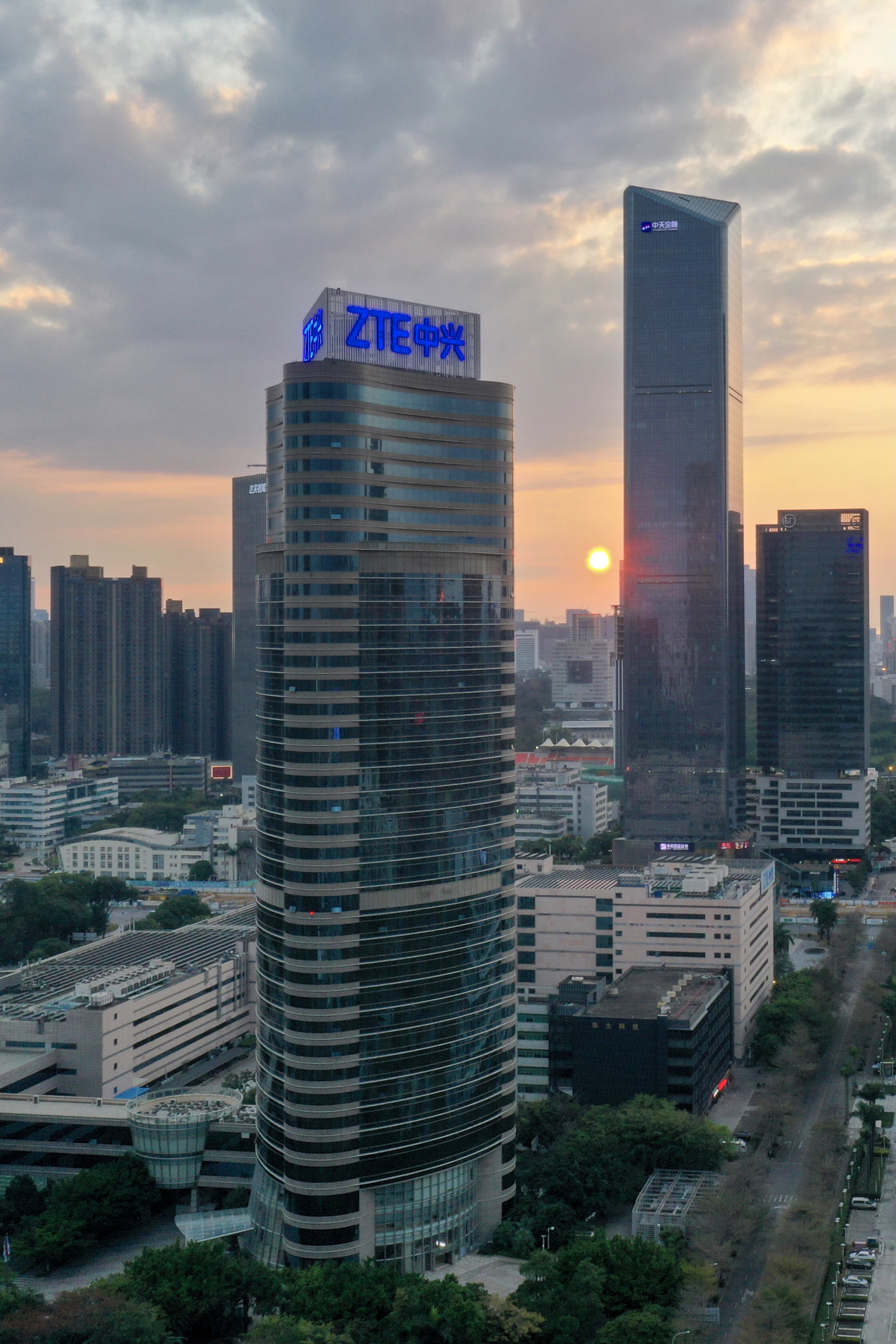
ZTE Headquarters

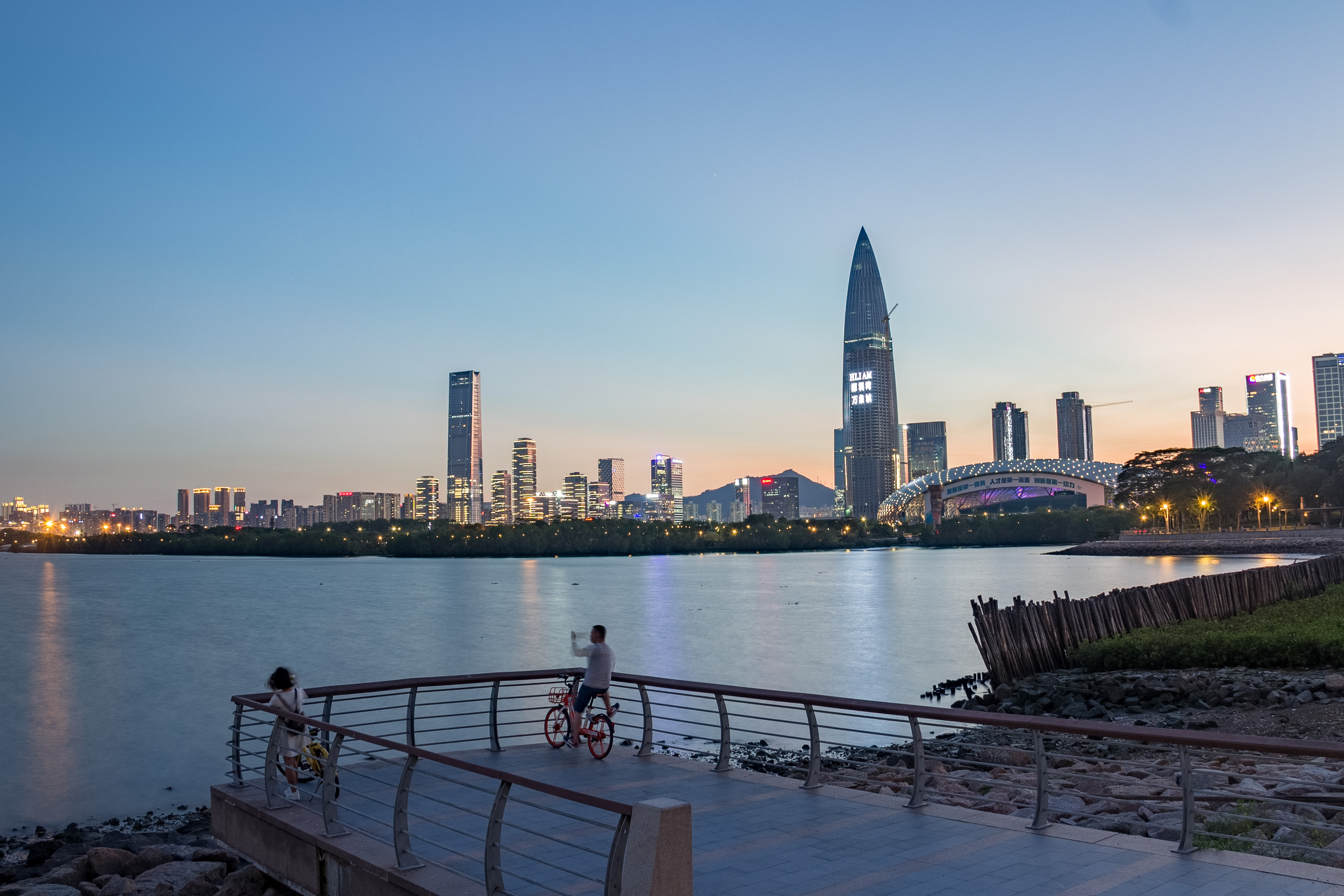
Skyline of Shenzhen Bay as viewed from Shenzhen Bay Park

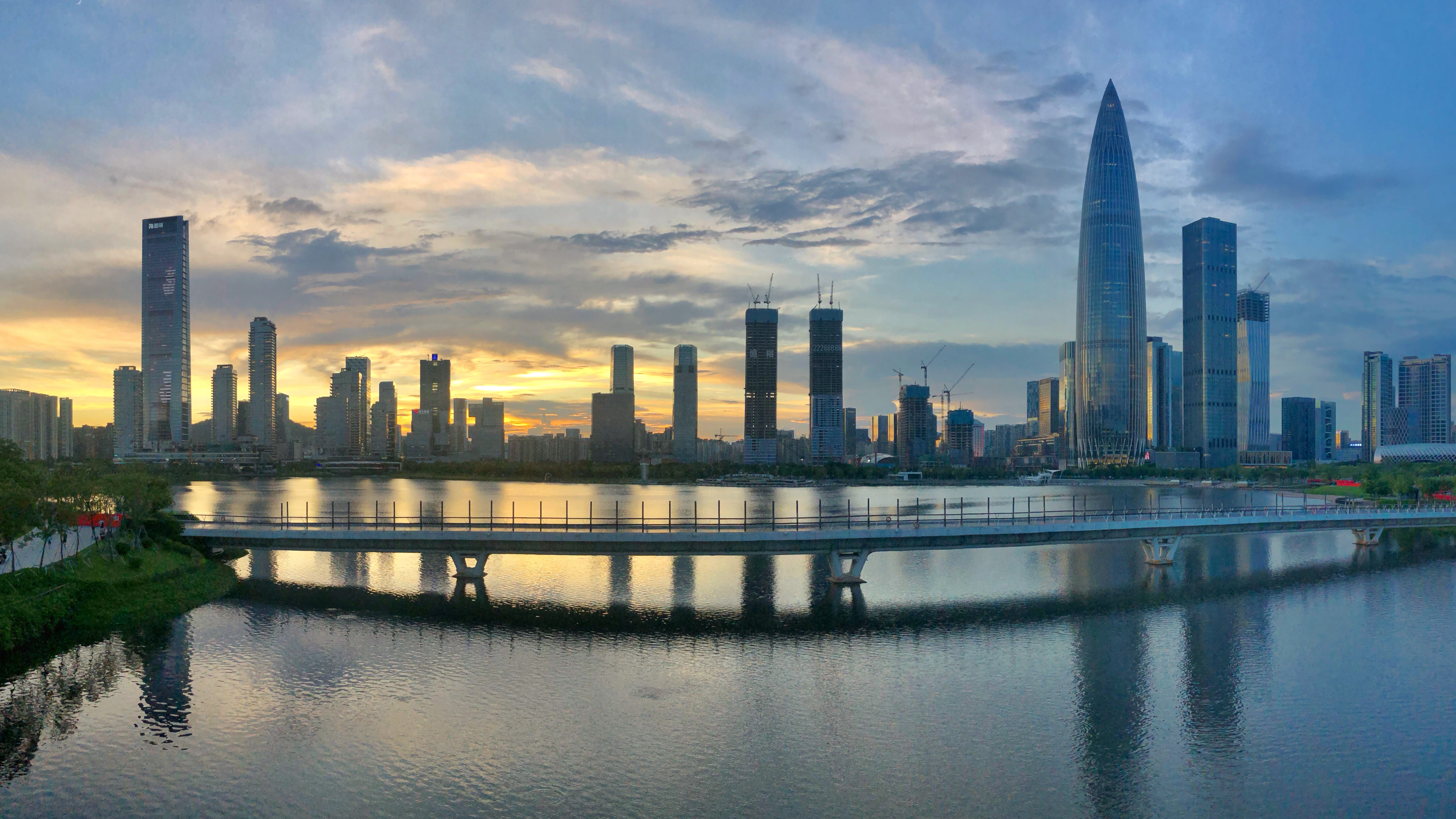
Skyline of Shenzhen Bay as viewed from Houhai Bridge in 2020.

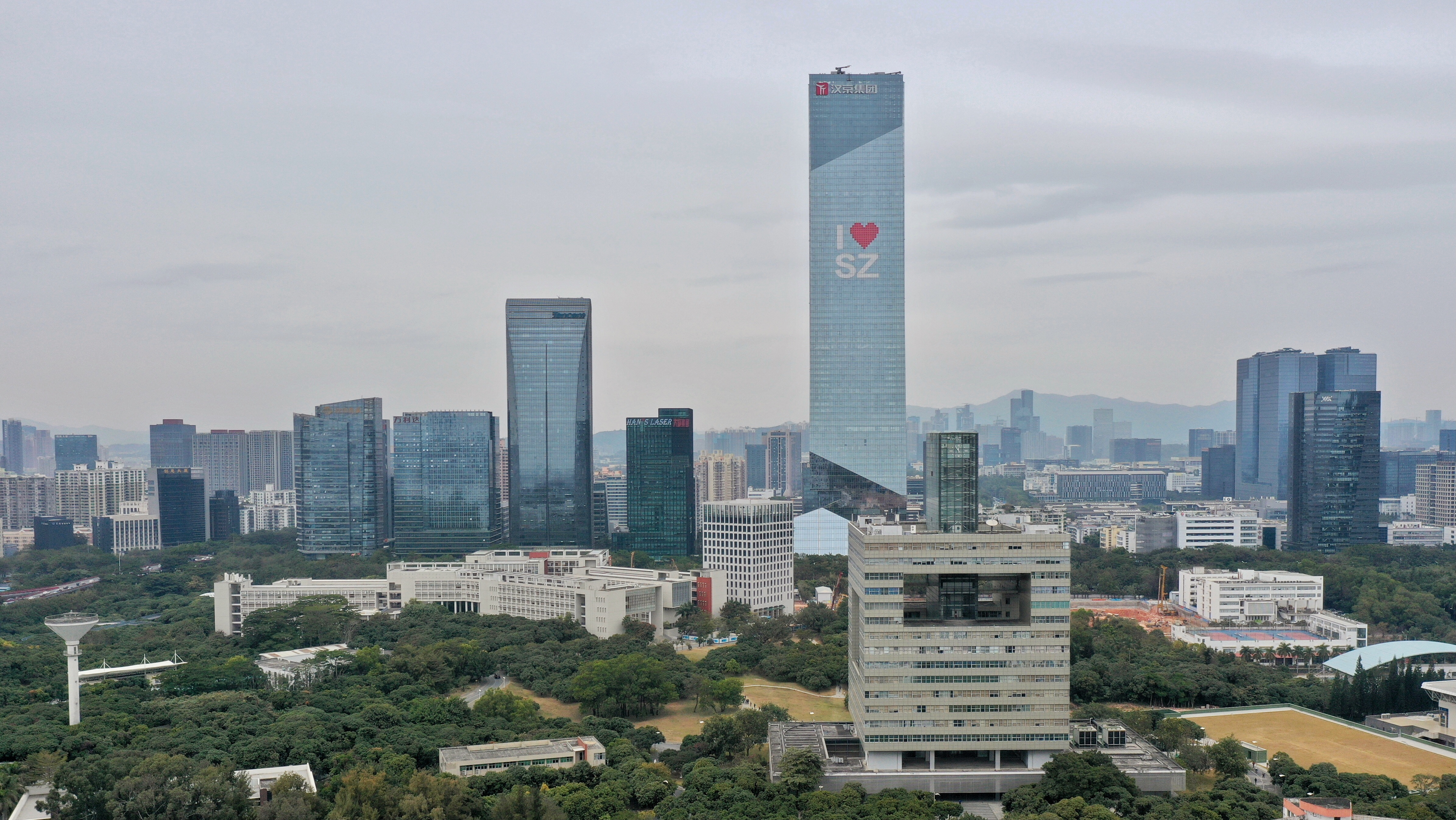
Skyline as viewed from Shenzhen University with Hanking Center (tallest building) on the right in 2021.

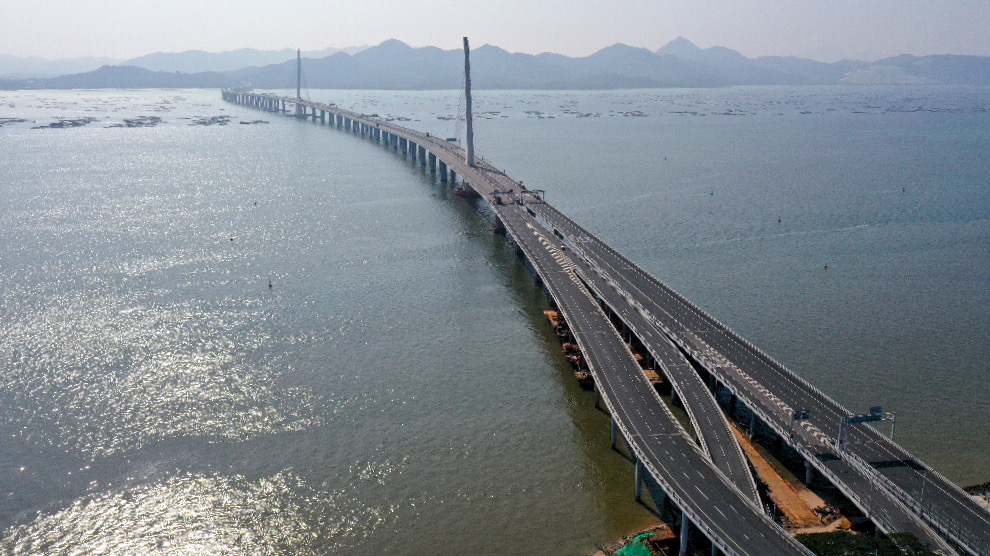
Shenzhen Bay Bridge in 2021.

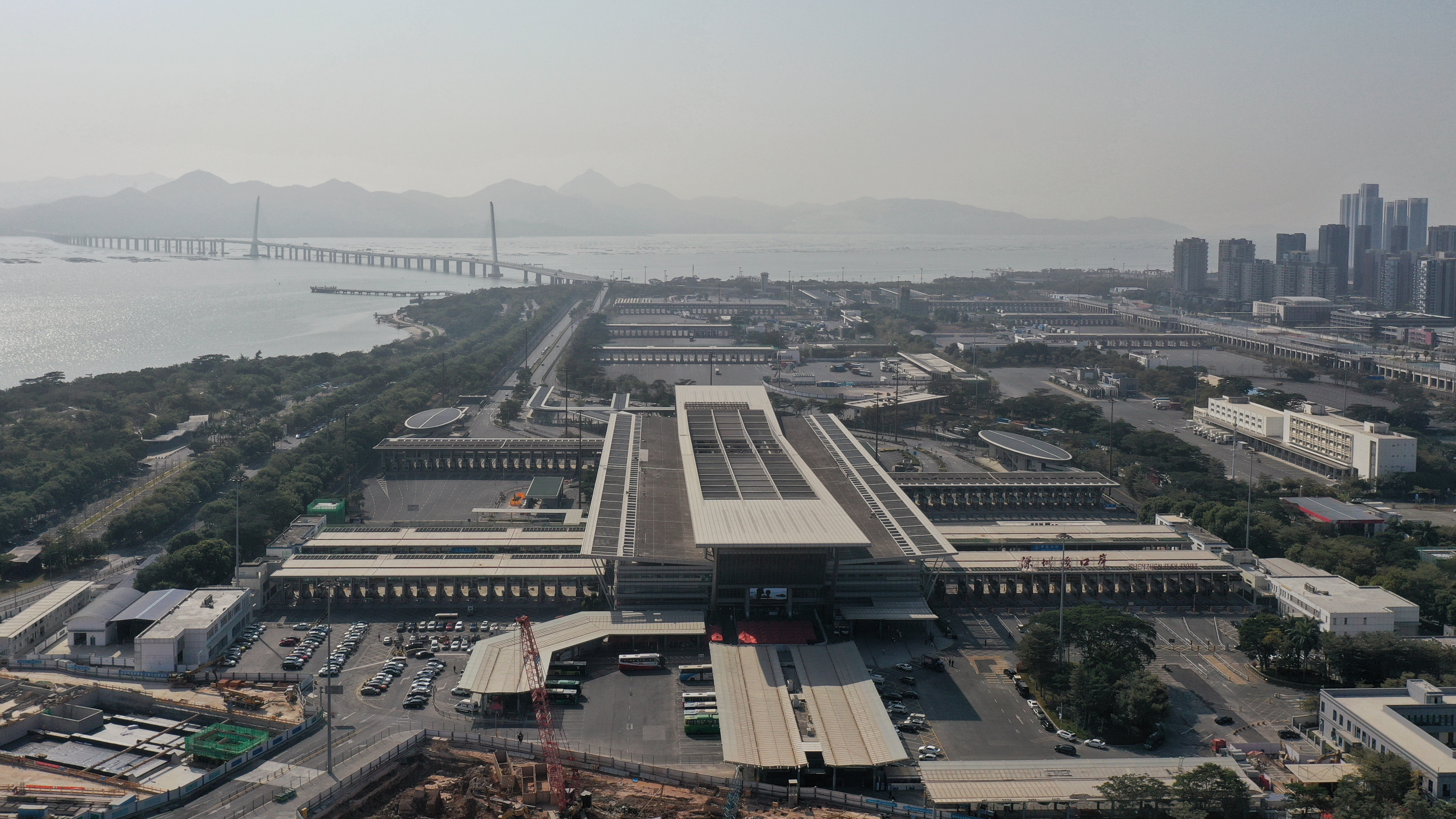
Shenzhen Bay Port in 2021.

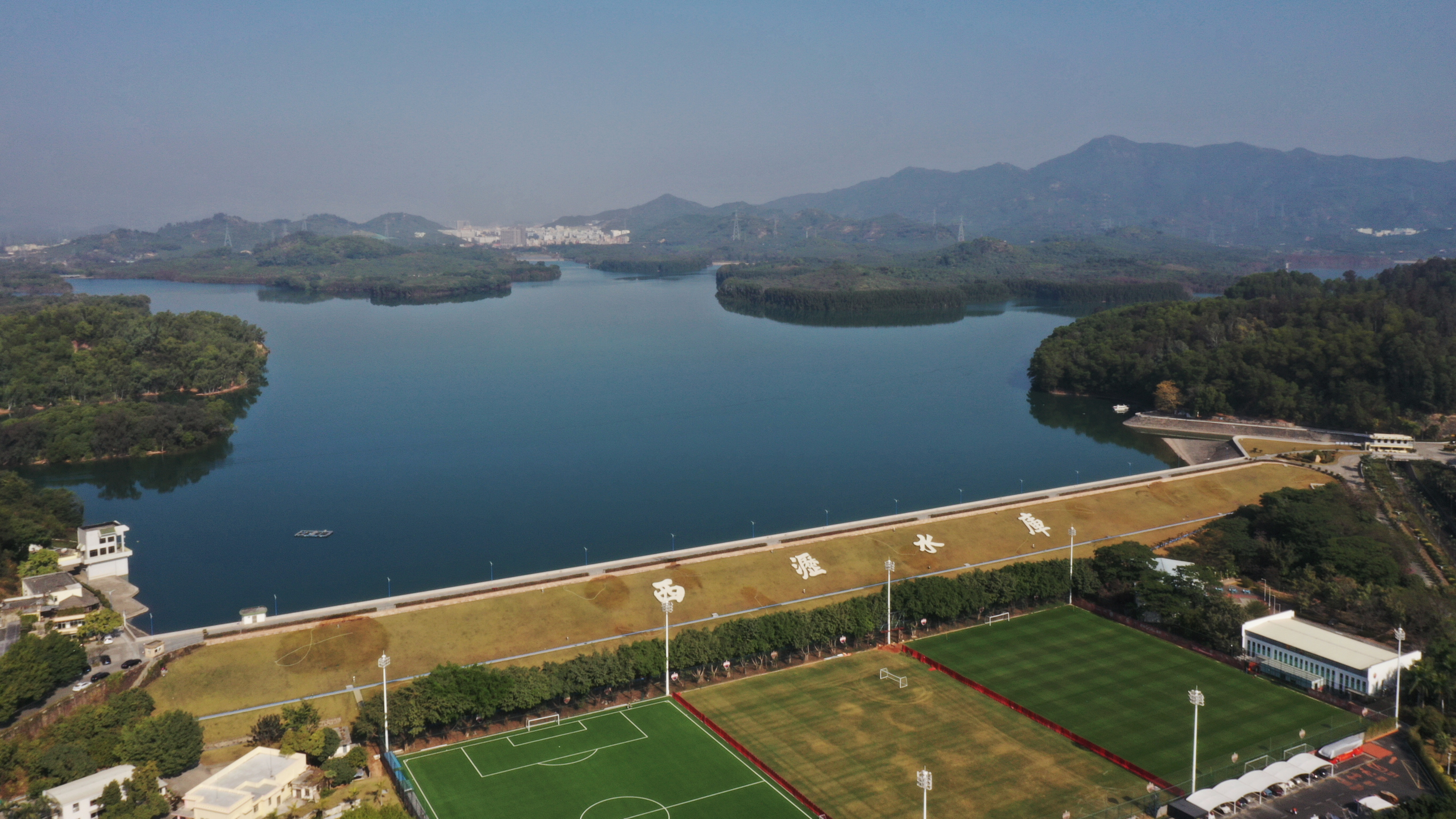
Xili Reservoir in 2021.

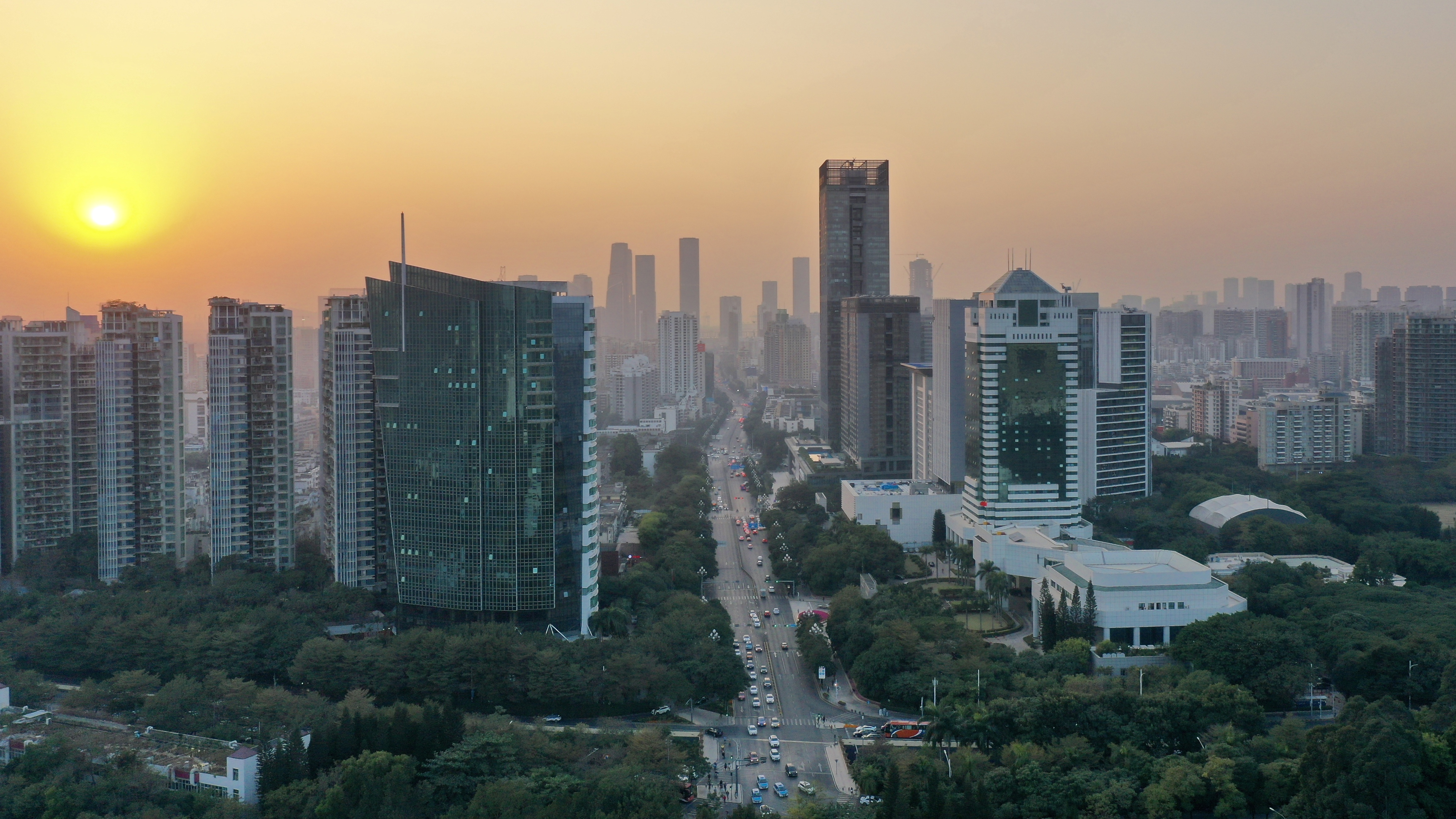
Taoyuan Road at dust with Nanshan District Government on the right side in 2021.

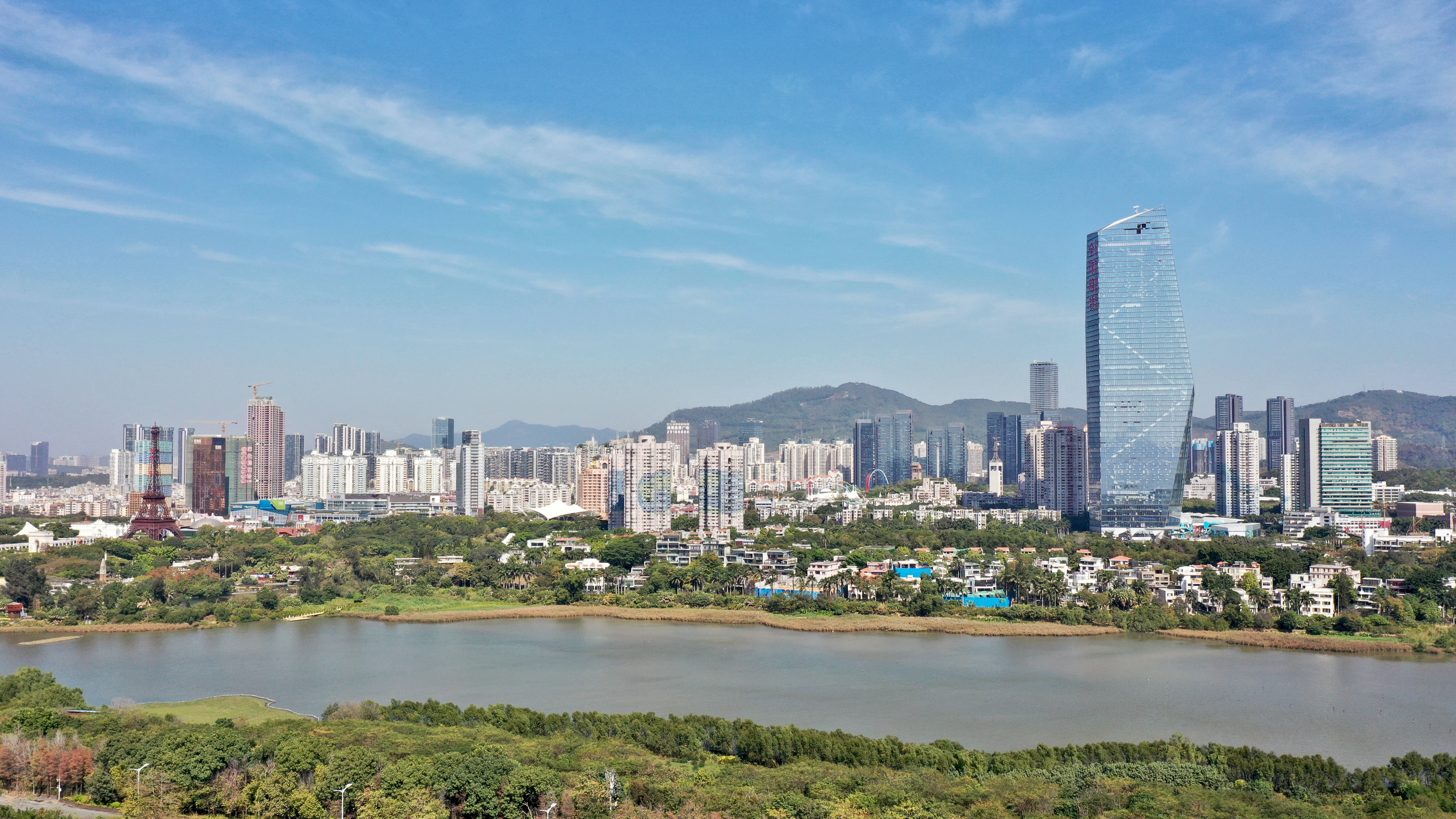
Overseas Chinese Town with OCT Tower on the right side in 2020.

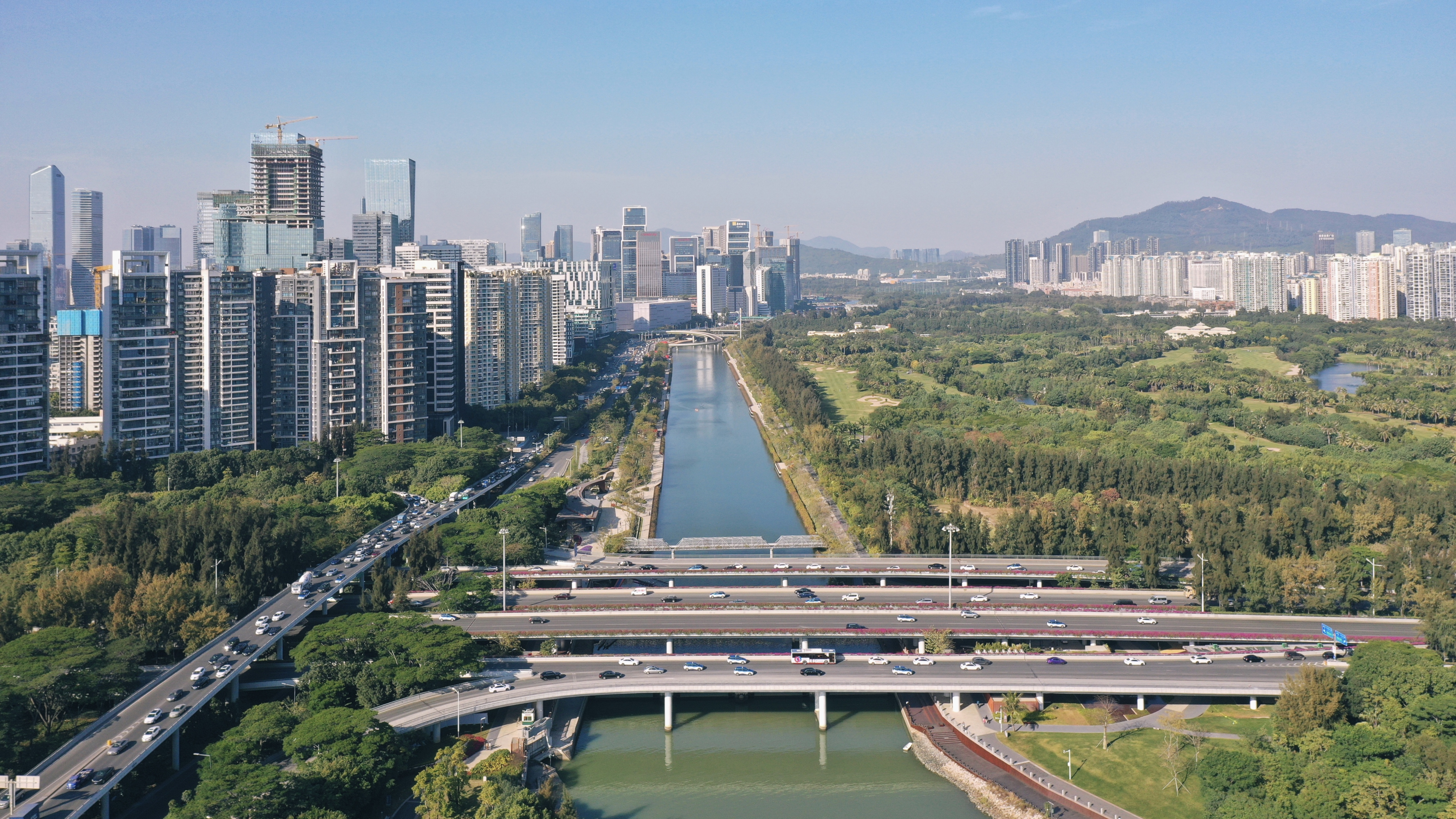
Dasha River in 2020.

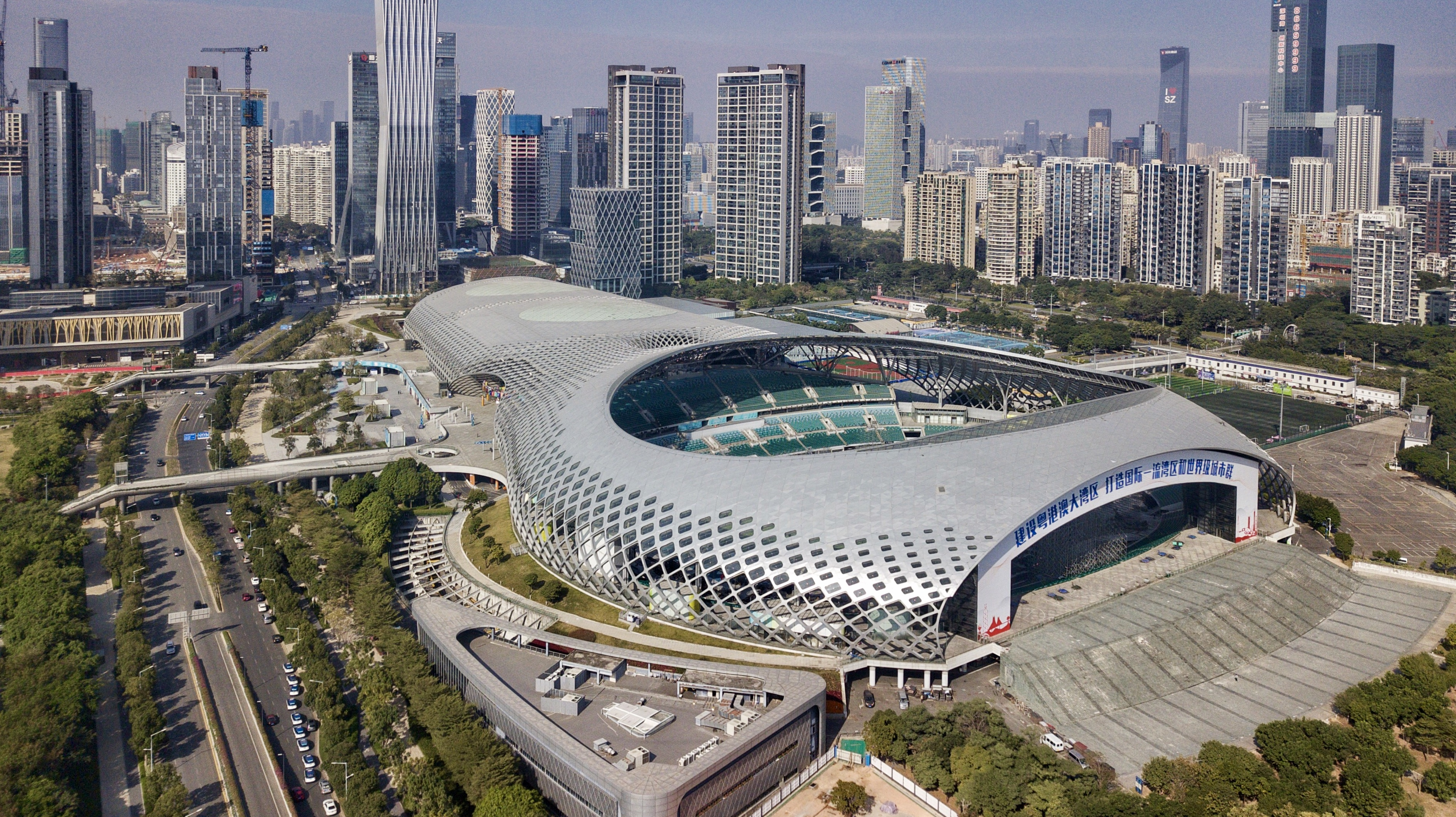
Shenzhen Bay Sports Center in 2020.

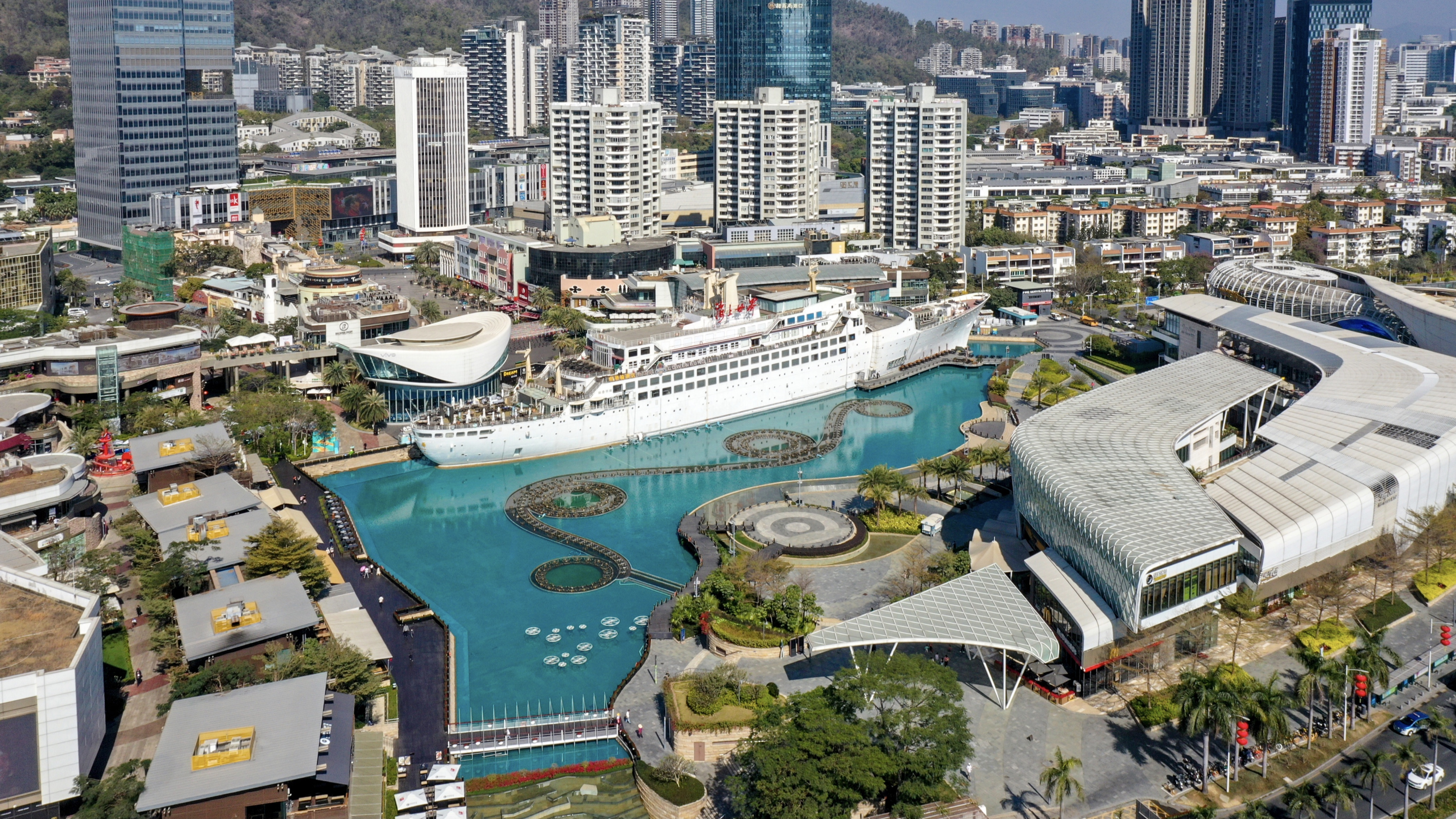
Shekou Sea World in 2020.

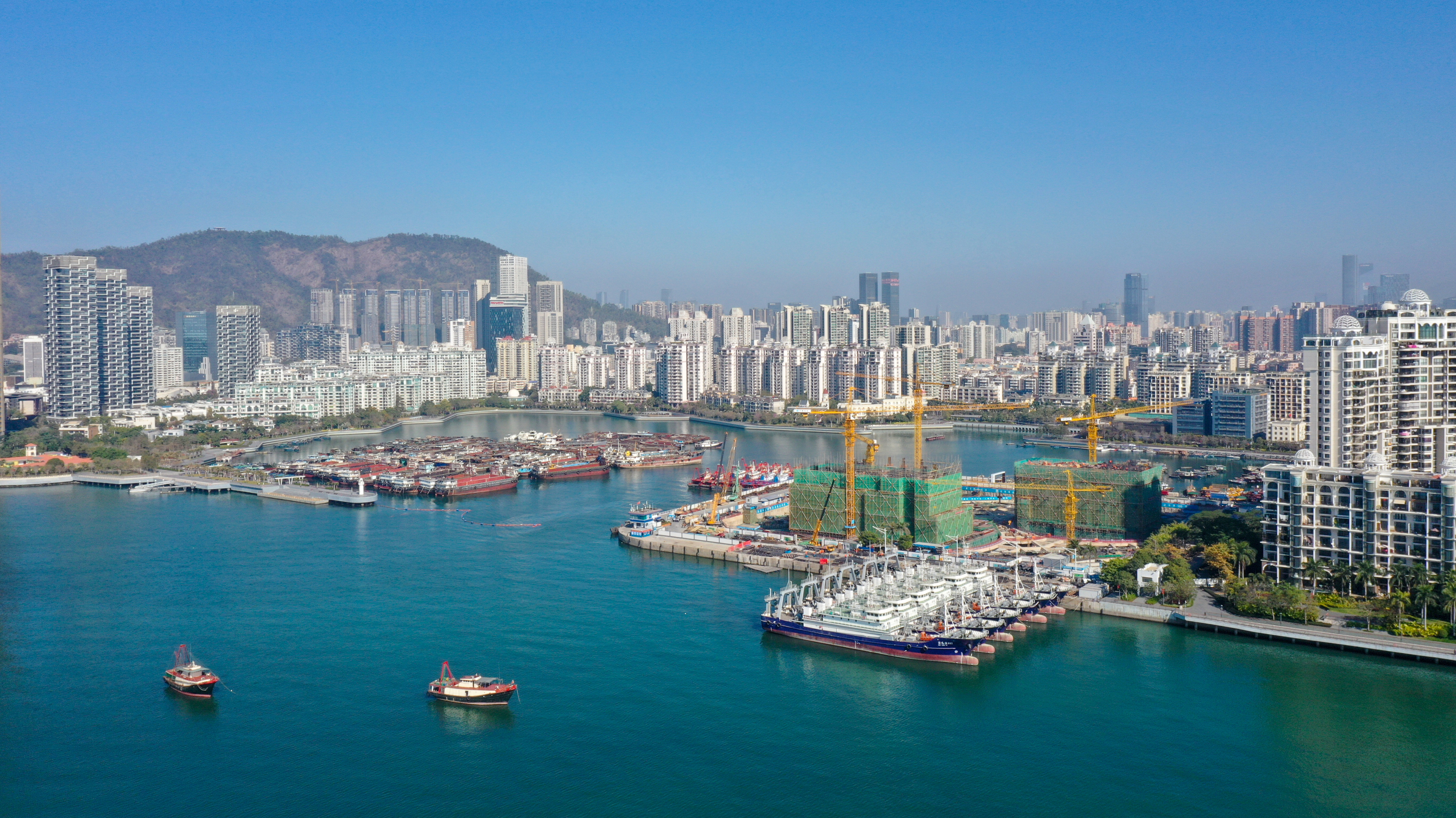
Shekou Fishing Harbour in 2020.
