= Nanyou station =

Shenzhen Metro Line 9 and Line 12 station

Nanyou 南油
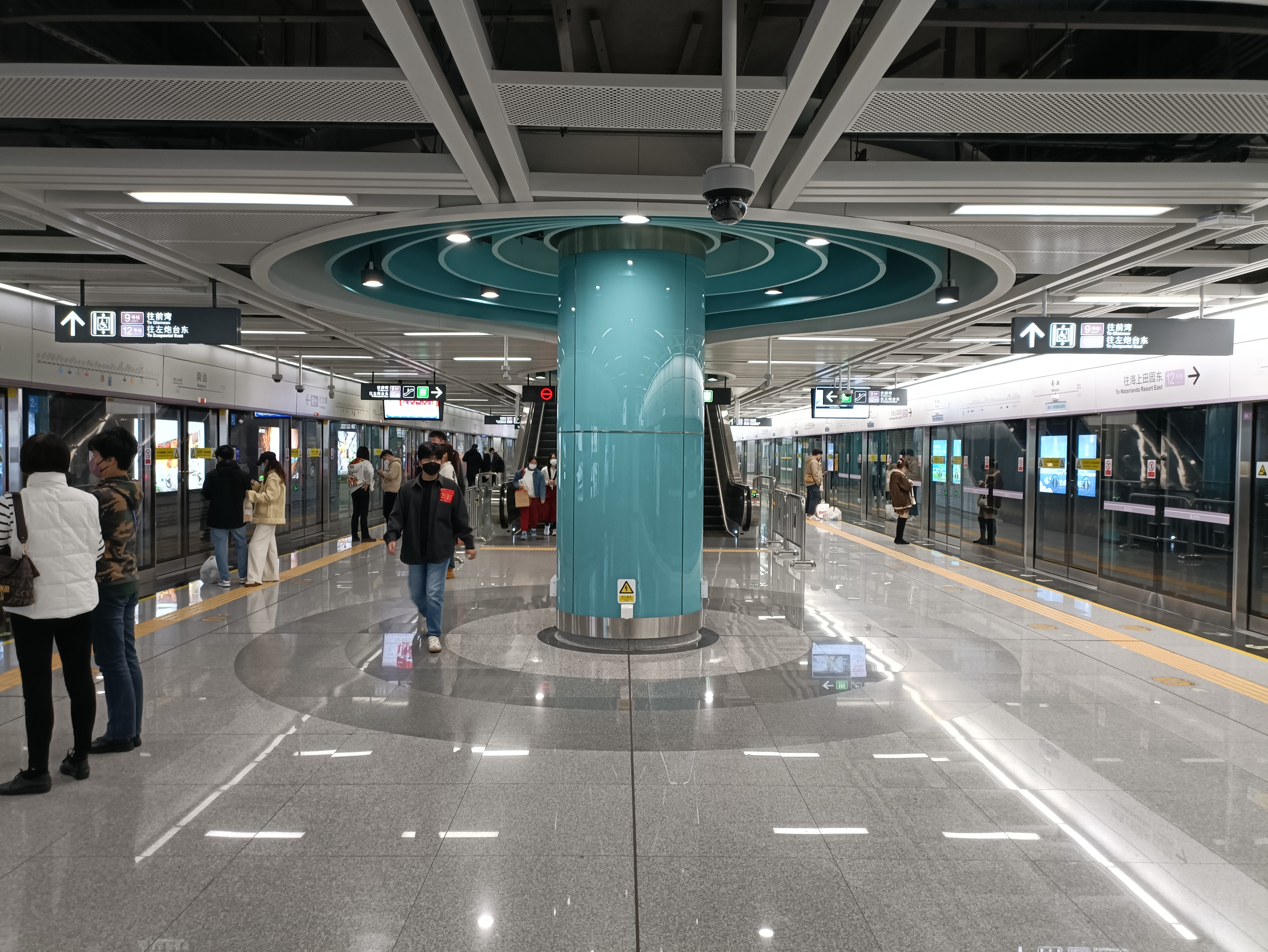
- Lines 9 and 12 northbound platforms

Chinese name
- Chinese: 南油
Transcriptions
Standard Mandarin
- Hanyu Pinyin: Nányóu
Yue: Cantonese
- Yale Romanization: Nàahmyàu
- Jyutping: Namm4 Jau4

General information
- Location: Intersection of Nanhai Boulevard and Dengliang Road; Nanshan District, Shenzhen, Guangdong; China
- Coordinates: 22°30′48.82″N 113°55′16.14″E
- Operator: SZMC (Shenzhen Metro Group); Shenzhen Line 12 Rail Transit Co., Ltd (Shenzhen Metro Group and PowerChina PPP)
- Lines: Line 9; Line 12
- Platforms: 4 (2 island platforms)
- Tracks: 4

Construction
- Structure type: Underground
- Accessible: Yes

History
- Opened: Line 9: 8 December 2019 (6 years ago); Line 12: 28 November 2022 (3 years ago)

Services
Preceding station	Shenzhen Metro	Following station
Nanshan Book Mall towards Wenjin	Line 9	Nanyou West towards Qianwan
Nanguang towards Songgang	Line 12	Sihai towards Zuopaotai East
Location

Nanyou station (Chinese: 南油站; pinyin: Nányóu Zhàn; Cantonese Yale: Nàahmyàu Jaahm) is an interchange station for Line 9 and Line 12 of the Shenzhen Metro. It opened on 8 December 2019 with Line 9, and Line 12 opened on 28 November 2022.

== Station layout ==
G	–	Exit
B1F; Concourse	Lobby	Ticket Machines, Customer Service, Station Control Room; Underground passageway towards Nanshan Book Mall (not open)
B2F; Platforms	Platform	9 towards Wenjin (Nanshan Book Mall)
B2F; Platforms	Island platform, doors will open on the left (Line 9) / right (Line 12)
B2F; Platforms	Platform	12 towards Songgang (Nanguang)
B2F; Platforms	Platform	12 towards Zuopaotai East (Sihai)
B2F; Platforms	Island platform, doors will open on the left (Line 9) / right (Line 12)
B2F; Platforms	Platform	9 towards Qianwan (Nanyou West)

=== Entrances/exits ===
The station has 7 points of entry/exit. Exits A, D and E are accessible via elevators. Exit F2 is not open.

Exit		Destination
Exit A		East Side of Nanhai Boulevard (S), Evergrande Tianjing Garden, Evergrande Times Financial Center
Exit B		East Side of Nanhai Boulevard (S), South Side of Dengliang Road (E), Nanyuan Dongbin Gardening Field Dongbin Flower Field
Exit C	C1	East Side of Nanhai Boulevard (N), North Side of Dengliang Road (E), Longcheng Garden, Yashilijing Garden
Exit C	C2	East Side of Nanhai Boulevard (N), Mengxiang Garden, Longcheng Garden
Exit D		West Side of Nanhai Boulevard (N), Laifushi Shopping Mall
Exit E		West Side of Nanhai Boulevard (N), North Side of Dengliang Road (S), Baifu Building, Hengyu Building, Gongyuandao Building
Exit F	F1	West Side of Nanhai Boulevard (S), South Side of Yuehai Road (W), Jinhui Garden, Shenzhen Animation Park, Xinbaohui Building
Exit F	F2	East Side of Nanhai Boulevard (S), North Side of Huaming Road (E), Haihui Building, Xinhe Shopping Mall

== Gallery ==
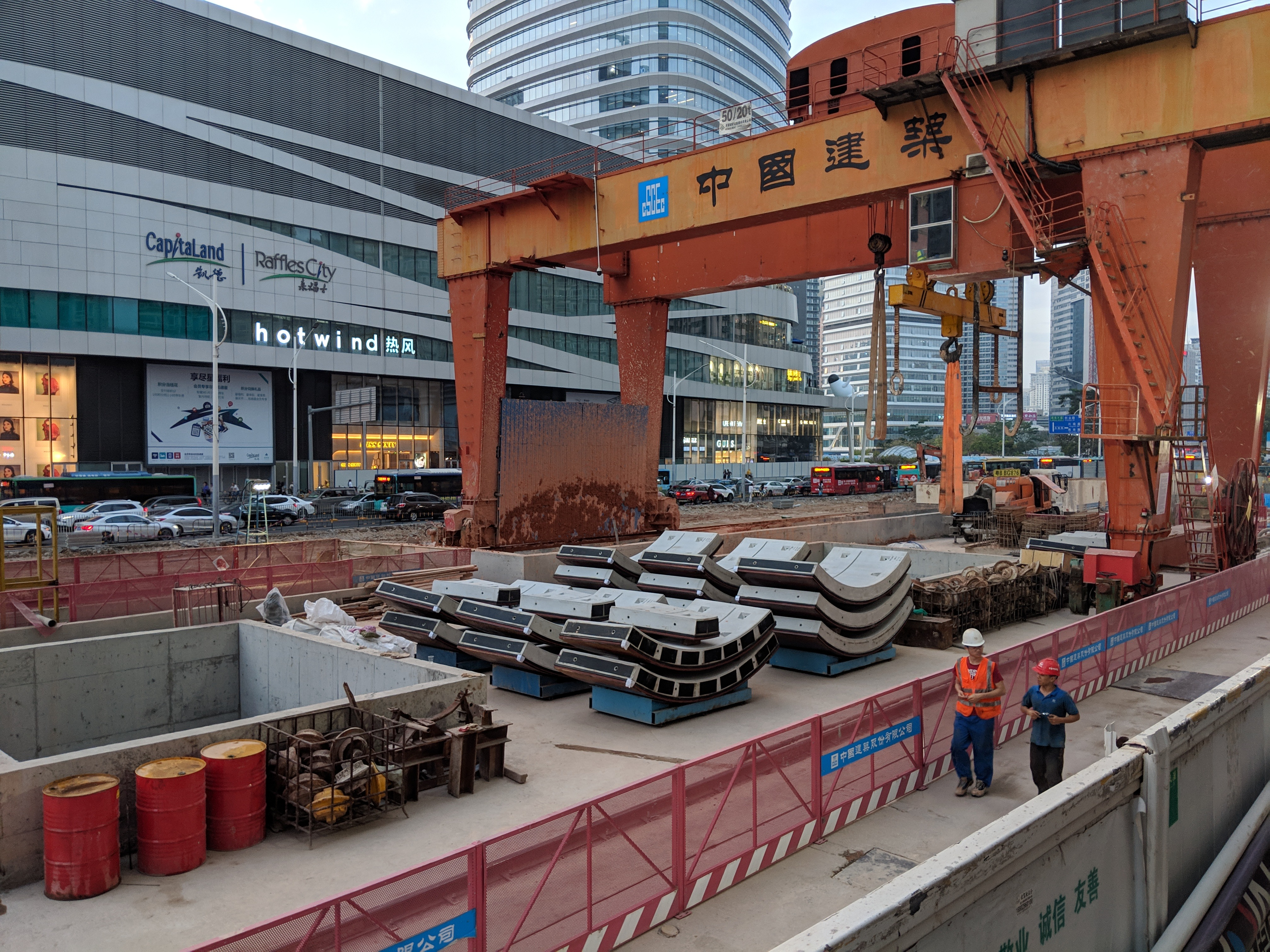
Construction site

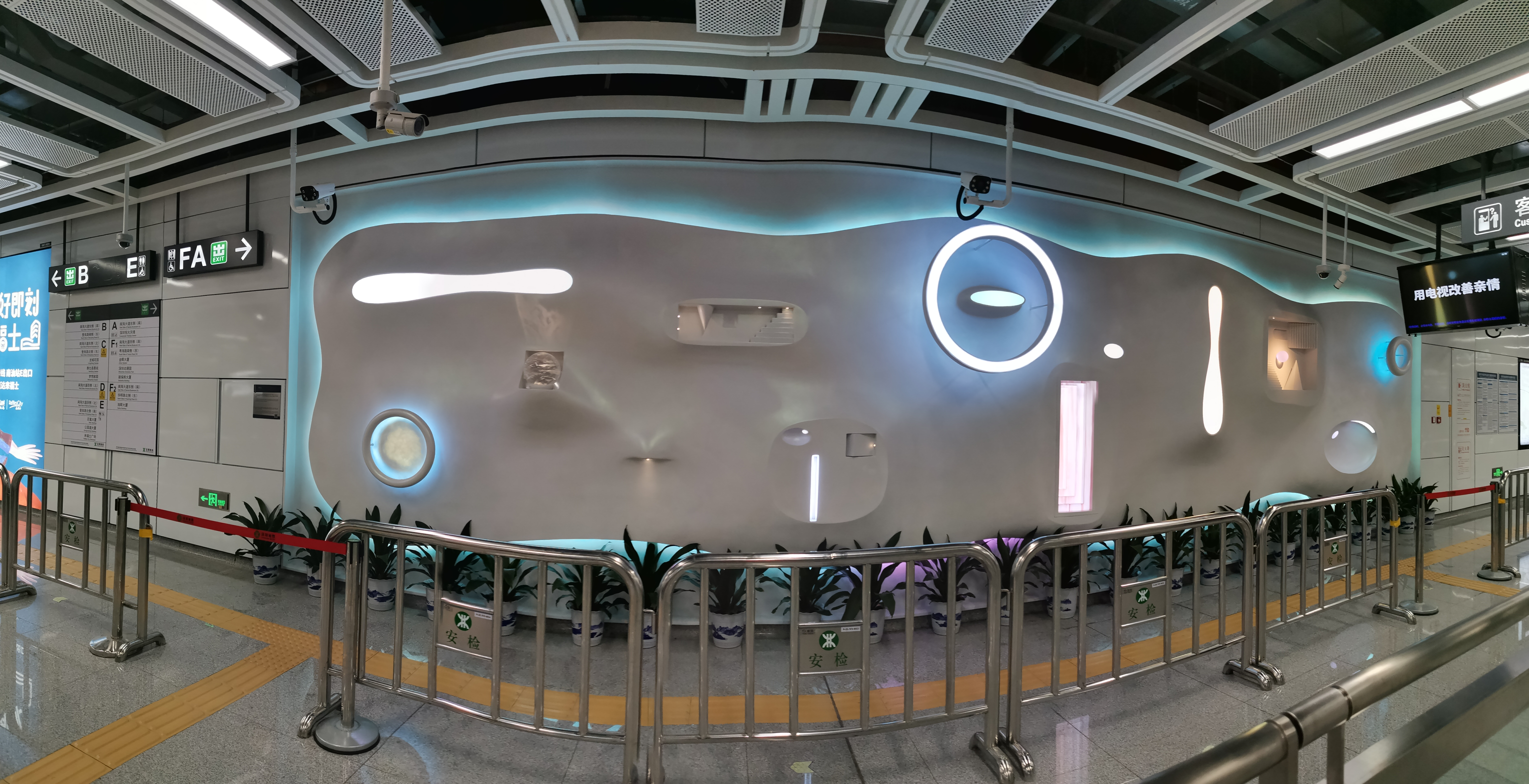
Art wall
