= Litchi Orchards station =

Metro station in Shenzhen, Guangdong, China

Coordinates: 22°31′46″N 113°59′6″E

Litchi Orchards 荔林
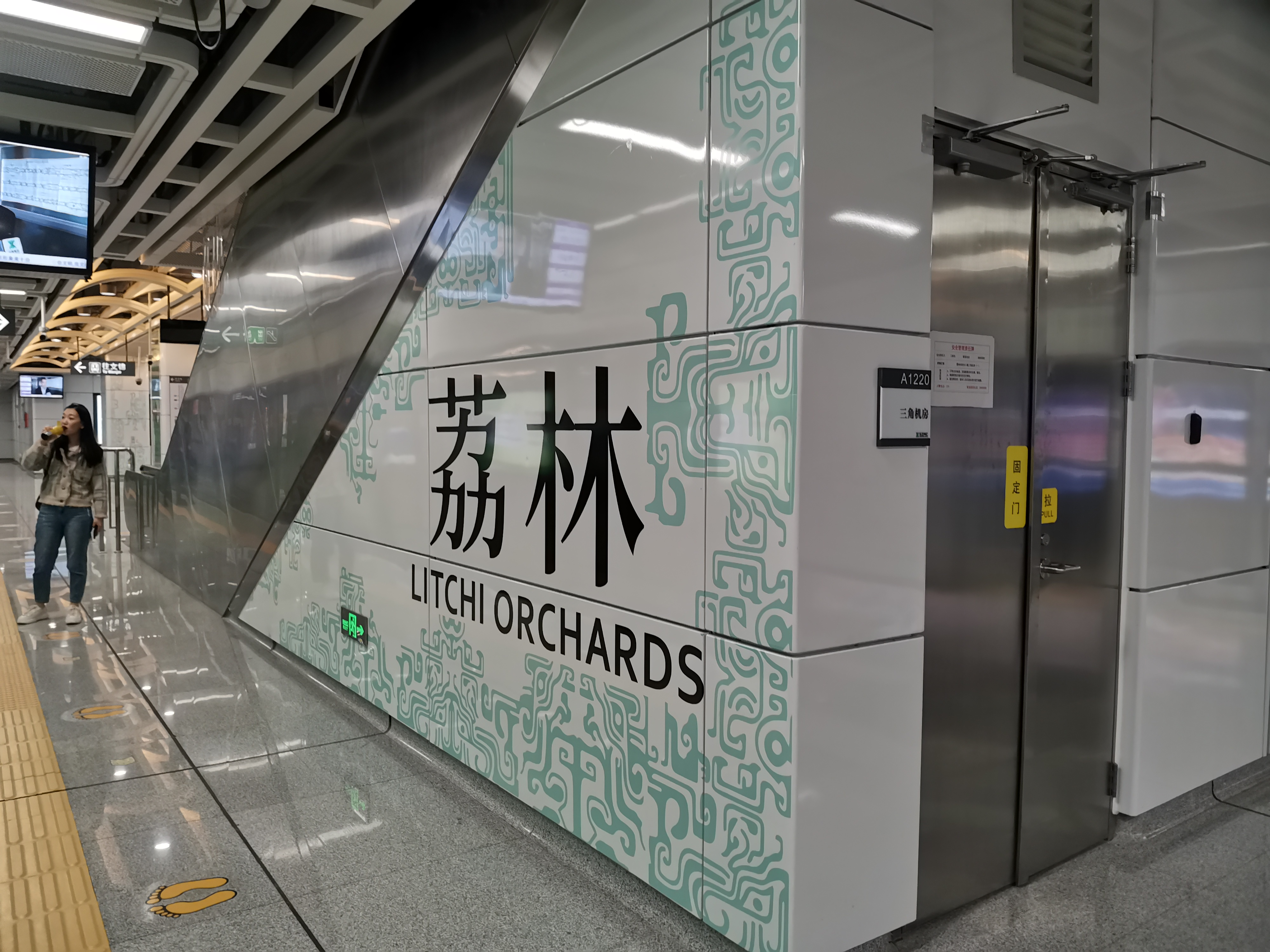

General information
- Location: Nanshan District, Shenzhen, Guangdong; China
- Operated by: SZMC (Shenzhen Metro Group)
- Line: Line 9

History
- Opened: 8 December 2019

Services
| Preceding station | Shenzhen Metro | Following station |
|---|---|---|
| Nanyou West towards Wenjin | Line 9 | Yihai towards Qianwan |
Location

Litchi Orchards station (Chinese: 荔林站; pinyin: Lìlín Zhàn; Jyutping: lai6 lam4 zaam6) is a metro station of Shenzhen Metro Line 9. It opened on 8 December 2019.
