= Nanguang station =

Shenzhen Metro station

Nanguang 南光
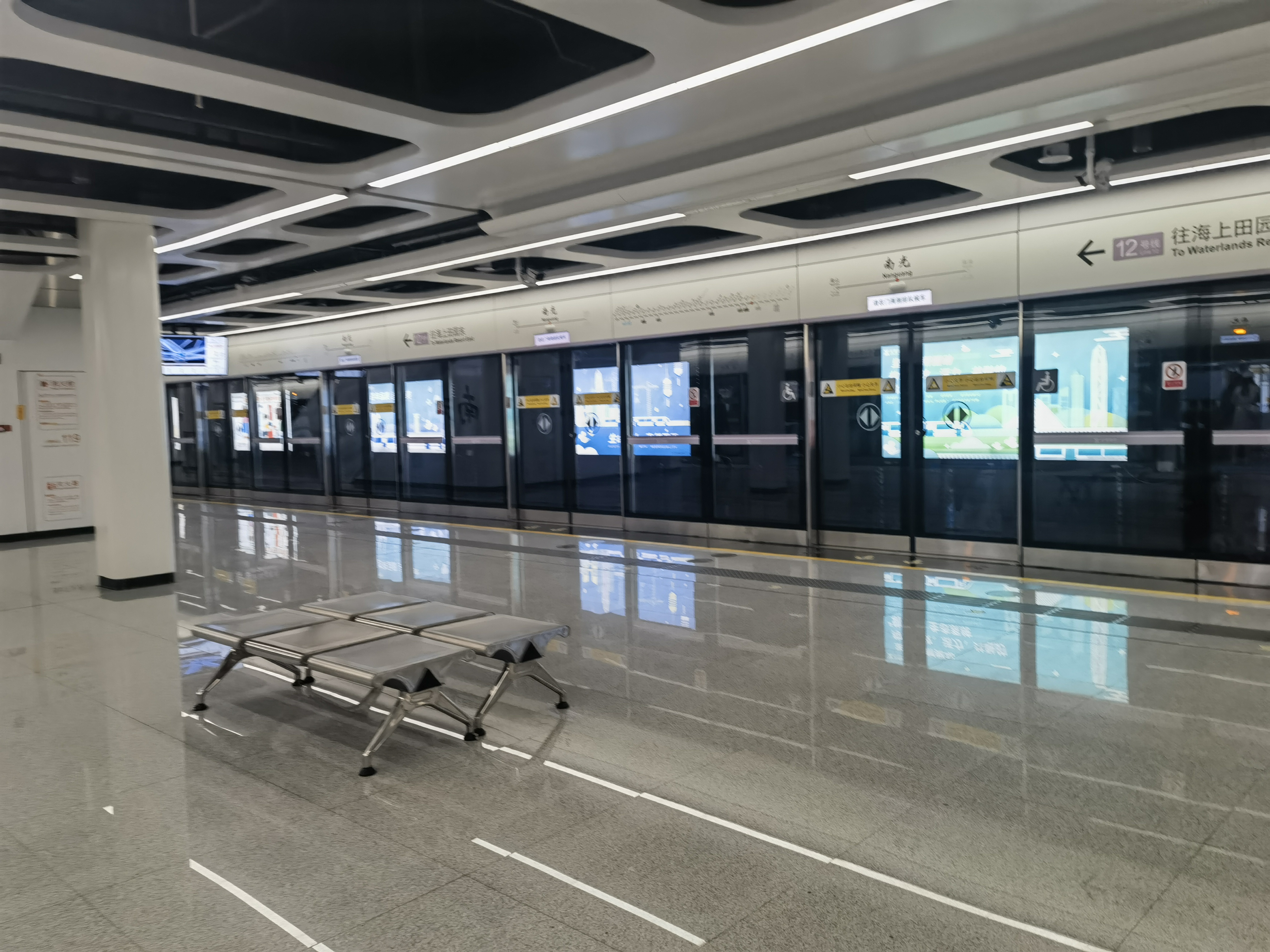
- Platform

Chinese name
- Chinese: 南光
Transcriptions
Standard Mandarin
- Hanyu Pinyin: Nánguāng
Yue: Cantonese
- Yale Romanization: Nàahmgwōng
- Jyutping: Namm4 Guong1

General information
- Location: Intersection of Chuangye Road and Nanguang Road; Nanshan Subdistrict, Nanshan District, Shenzhen, Guangdong; China
- Coordinates: 22°31′10.67″N 113°55′11.03″E
- Operator: Shenzhen Line 12 Rail Transit Co., Ltd (Shenzhen Metro Group and PowerChina PPP)
- Line: Line 12
- Platforms: 2 (1 island platform)
- Tracks: 2

Construction
- Structure type: Underground
- Accessible: Yes

History
- Opened: 28 November 2022 (3 years ago)

Services
| Preceding station | Shenzhen Metro | Following station |
|---|---|---|
| Nanshan towards Songgang | Line 12 | Nanyou towards Zuopaotai East |
Location

Nanguang station (Chinese: 南光站; pinyin: Nánguāng Zhàn; Cantonese Yale: Nàahmgwōng Jaahm) is a metro station on Line 12 of Shenzhen Metro. It opened on 28 November 2022.

== Station layout ==
The station has an island platform under Chuangye Road.

| G | – | Exits A-C |
| B1F; Concourse | Lobby | Ticket Machines, Customer Service, Automatic Vending Machines |
| B2F; Platforms | Platform | 12 towards Songgang (Nanshan) |
| B2F; Platforms | Island platform, doors will open on the left |
| B2F; Platforms | Platform | 12 towards Zuopaotai East (Nanyou) |

=== Entrances/exits ===
The station has 4 points of entry/exit, with Exit B1 being accessible via elevator.

| Exit | | Destination |
|---|---|---|
| Exit A | | Chuangye Road (N), Yihai Plaza, Neptune Building |
| Exit B | B1 | Chuangye Road (N), Modern City Huating, Yilida Building |
| Exit B | B2 | Chuangye Road (N), Modern City Huating, Yilida Building |
| Exit C | | Chuangye Road (S), Nanyou Shopping Park |

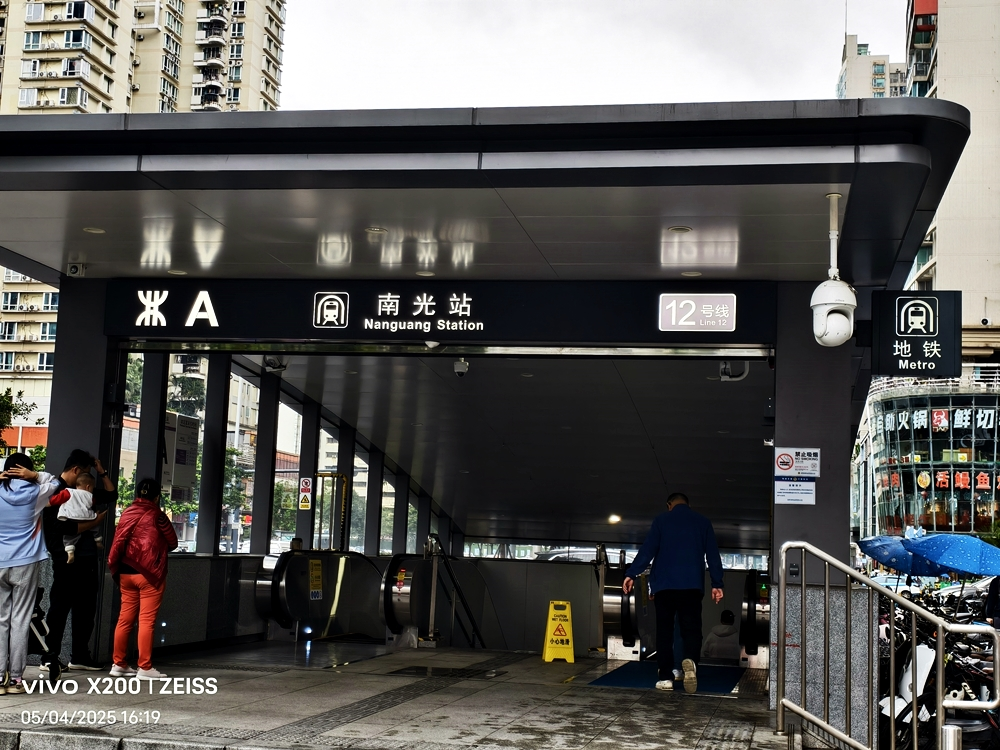
Entrance A

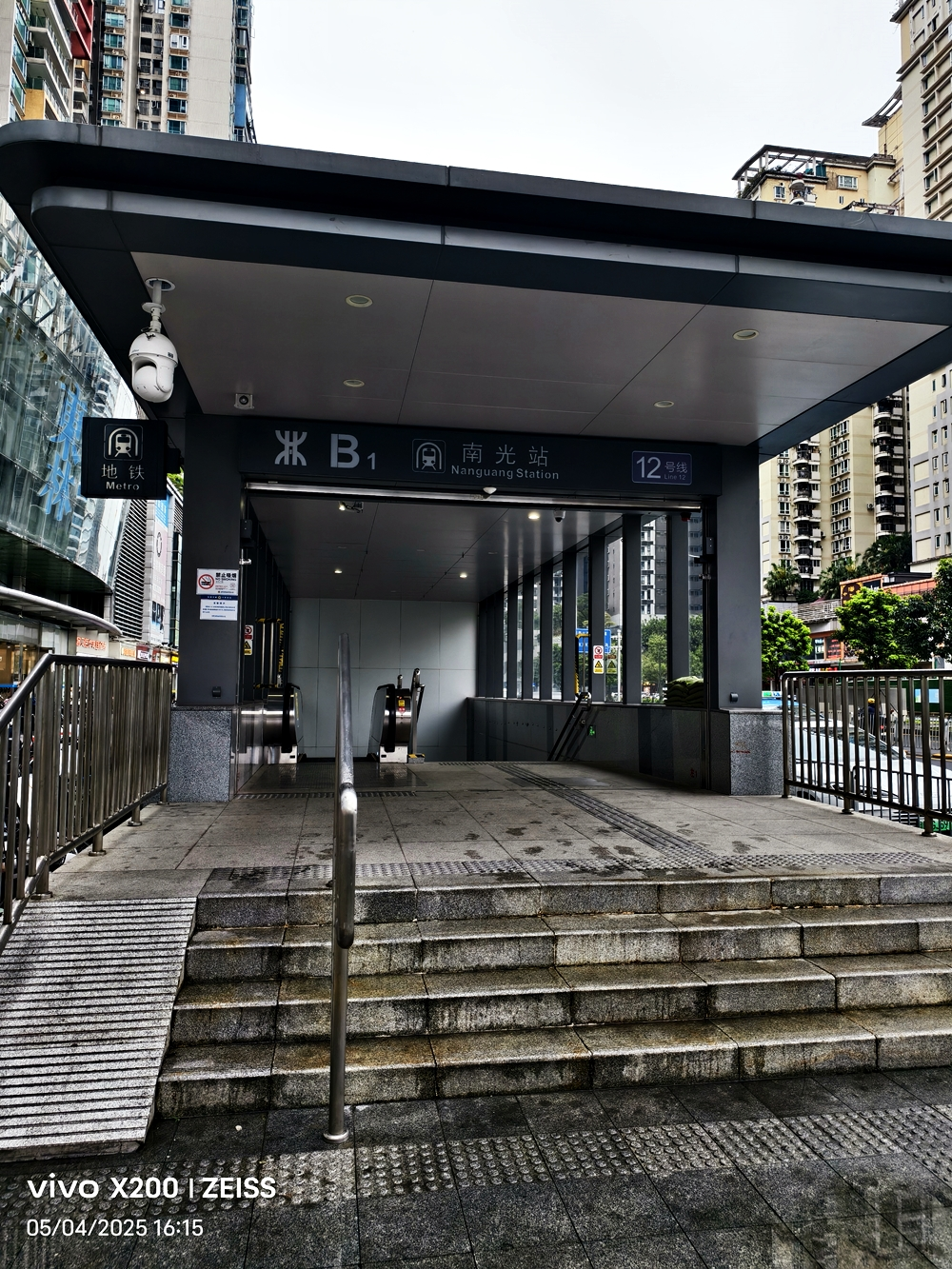
Entrance B1

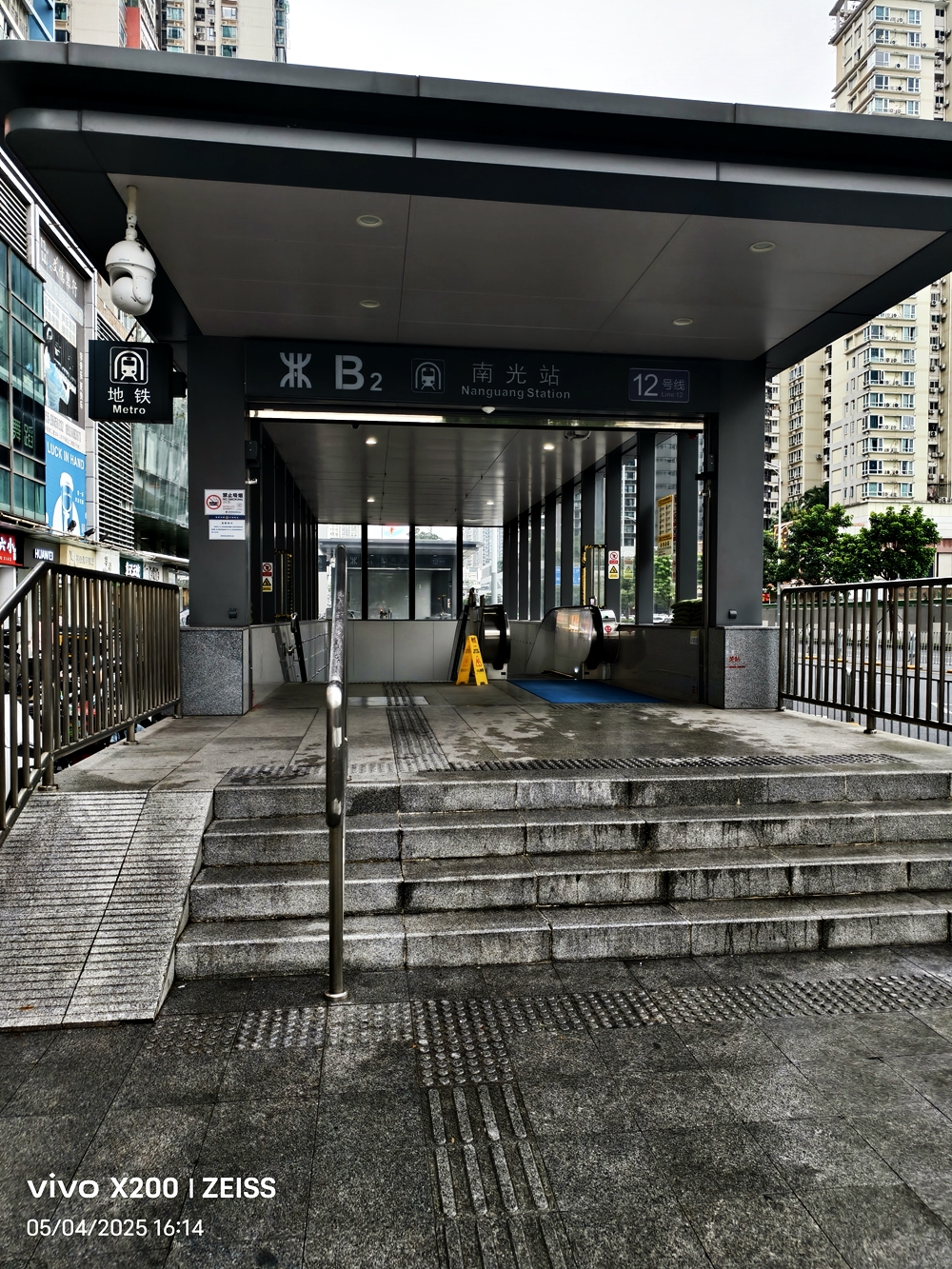
Entrance B2

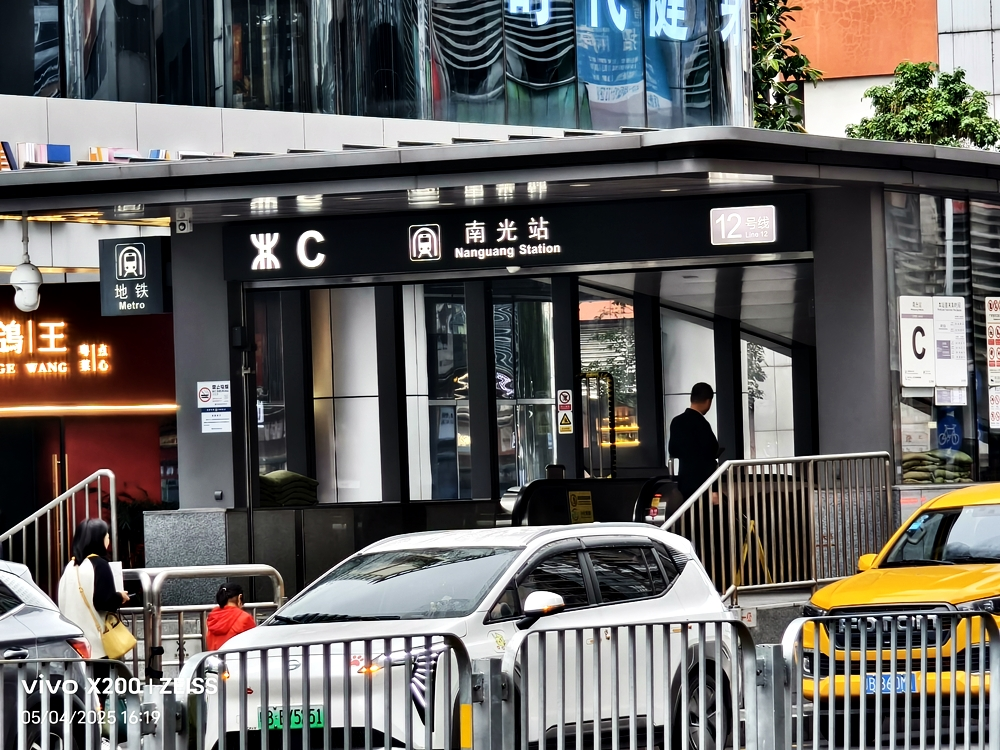
Entrance C
