= Nanyou West station =

Metro station in Shenzhen, China

Coordinates: 22°31′46″N 113°59′6″E

Nanyou West 南油西
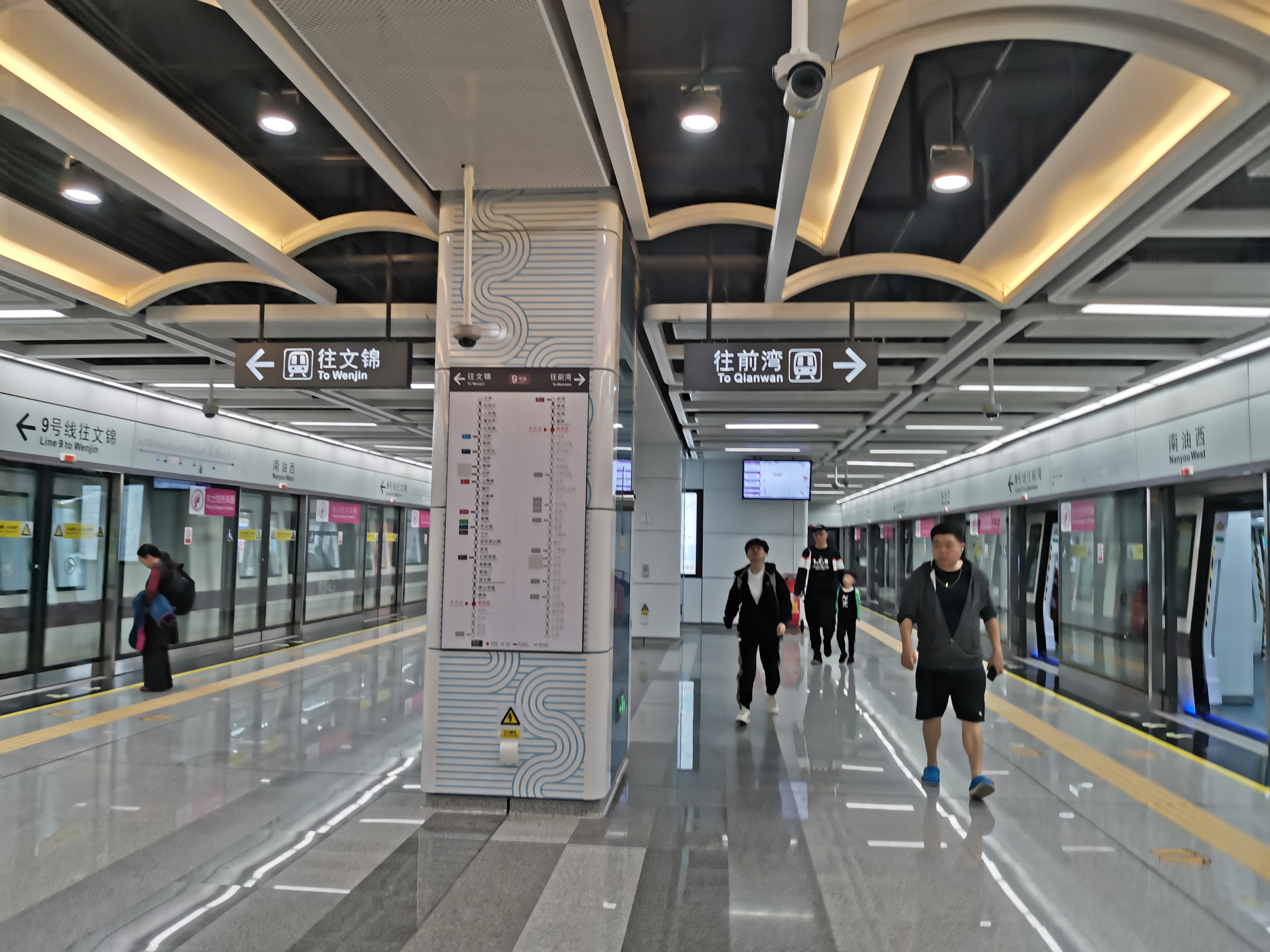

General information
- Location: Nanshan District, Shenzhen, Guangdong; China
- Operated by: SZMC (Shenzhen Metro Group)
- Line: Line 9

History
- Opened: 8 December 2019

Services
Preceding station	Shenzhen Metro	Following station
Nanyou towards Wenjin	Line 9	Litchi Orchards towards Qianwan
Location

Nanyou West station (Chinese: 南油西站; pinyin: Nányóu Xī Zhàn; Jyutping: naam4 jau4 sai1 zaam6) is a metro station of Shenzhen Metro Line 9. It opened on 8 December 2019.
