= Hanking Center =

Supertall skyscraper in Shenzhen, Guangdong, China

- 汉京中心
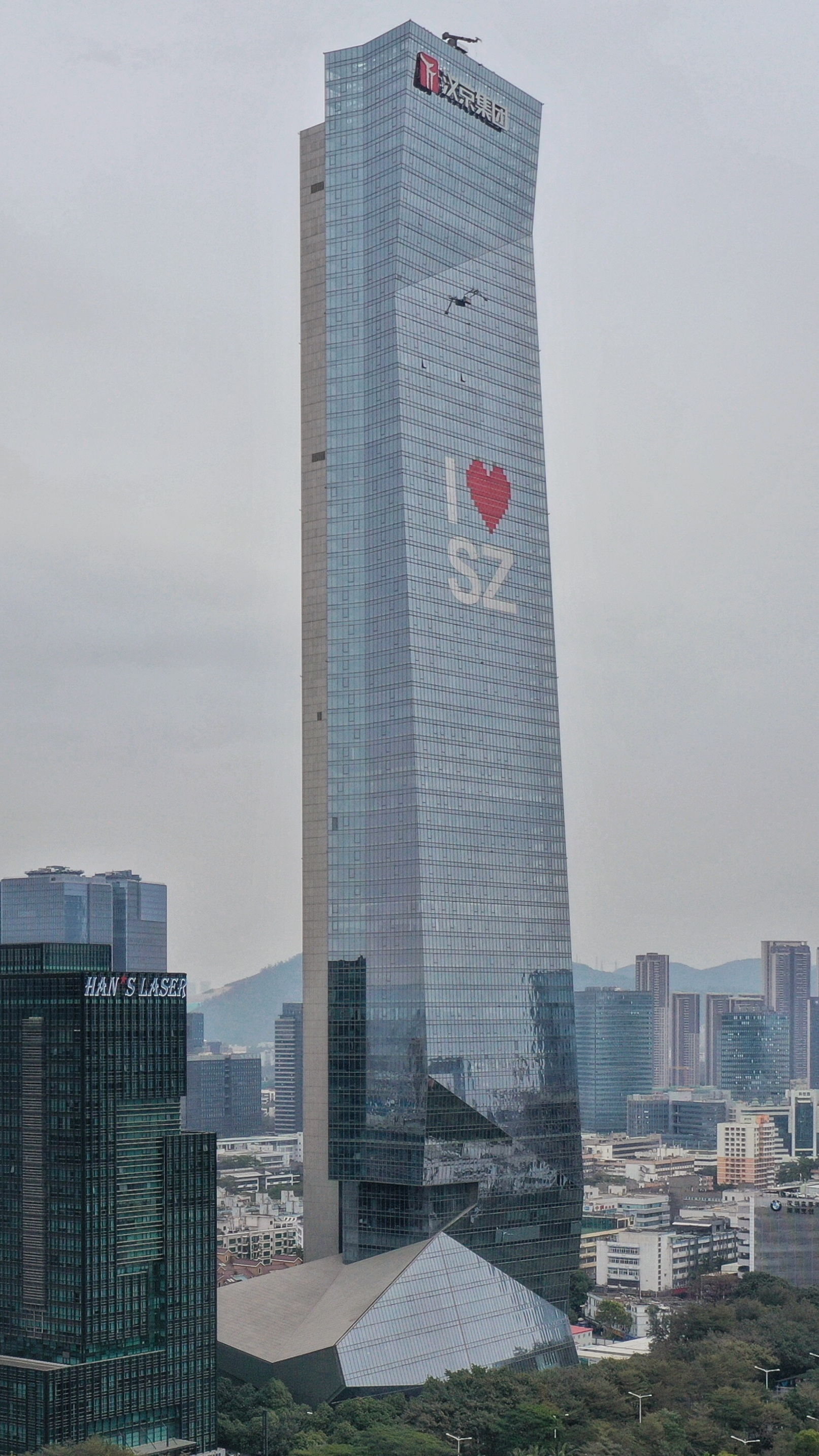
- Hanking Center in January 2021
- Interactive map of the Hanking Center area

General information
- Status: Completed
- Type: Office
- Location: 9968 Shennan Boulevard, Nanshan District, Shenzhen, Guangdong, China
- Coordinates: 22.54348°N 113.93164°E
- Construction started: 2013
- Completed: 2018
- Client: Hanking Group

Height
- Architectural: 358.9 m (1,177 ft)
- Tip: 358.9 m (1,177 ft)
- Top floor: 320 m (1,050 ft)

Technical details
- Floor count: 65
- Floor area: 167,000 square metres (1,797,573 sq ft)

Design and construction
- Architecture firm: Morphosis
- Structural engineer: Halvorson and Partners

Hanking Center is a skyscraper in Shenzhen, Guangdong, China. It is 358.9 metres (1,177.5 ft) tall. Construction started in 2013 and was completed in 2018.

It is the world's tallest building with a detached core. Morphosis, its design firm maximized the floor plan flexibility by moving circulation, services and amenities to the building's exterior core, connected to the main tower with glass skybridges and steel braces.

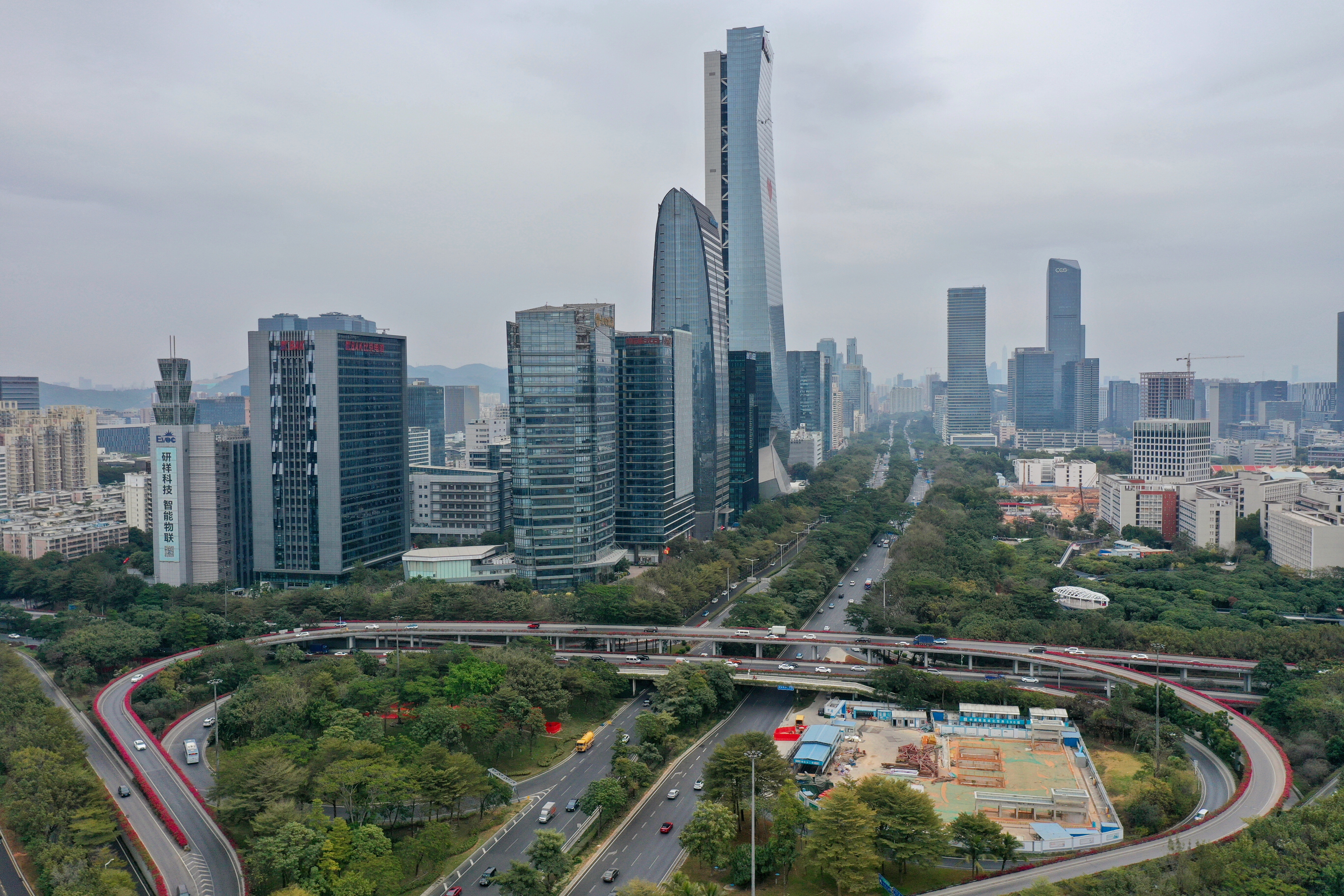
Clearer view of the detached core from Shennan Boulevard

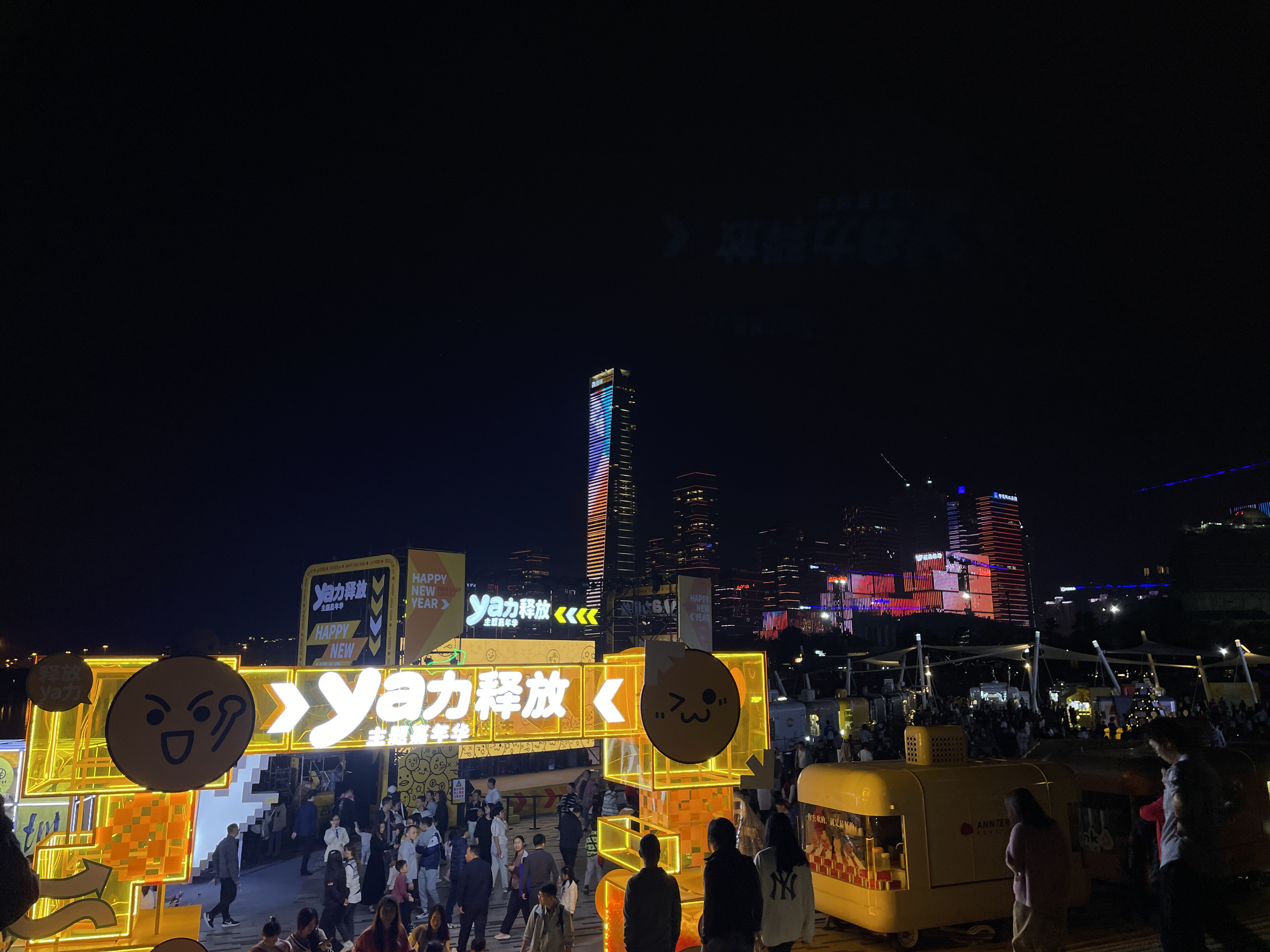
Hanking Centre from Ren Chai Park

== See also ==
- List of tallest buildings in Shenzhen
- List of tallest buildings in China
- List of tallest buildings in the world
