= Shenzhen Yucai High School =

School in Guangdong, China

深圳市育才中学

Location
- 2 Shekou Sixth Industrial Road, Nanshan District, Shenzhen, Guangdong, China

Information
- Other name: Shenzhen Yucai High School
- Type: Public
- Motto: 博学明理，慎思求真 (erudite and rational, careful thinking and seeking truth)
- Established: 1983
- School district: Shekou Yucai Education Group; Shekou
- Principal: Yao Xiaolan (姚晓岚)
- Faculty: 140
- Grades: high school one to high school three
- Enrollment: 1,200
- Language: Chinese
- Area: 41,135 square meters.
- Slogan: 缤纷育才，阳光校园 (Colorful education, sunny campus)
- magazine: 《春韵》"Spring Rhyme"
- Website: yczx.szns.edu.cn

Shenzhen Yucai High School (simplified Chinese: 深圳育才中学; traditional Chinese: 深圳育才中學; pinyin: Shēnzhèn Yùcái Zhōngxué; Jyutping: sam1 zan3 juk6 coi4 zung1 hok6) is a school in Shekou, Shenzhen, Guangdong, China.

Founded in 1995, Shenzhen Yucai High school has been developed into a regional education system, consisted of primary schools, middle schools and technical sections.

The Shenzhen Yucai High School is the fifth oldest school in Shenzhen and opened in 1995. The oldest school is Shenzhen Drug School, second oldest school is the Shenzhen Experiment School.

Notable alumni include Shenglong Zou, founder of Xunlei Technology.
