= Shenzhen University South station =

Metro station in China

Coordinates: 22°31′46″N 113°59′6″E

Shenzhen University South 深大南
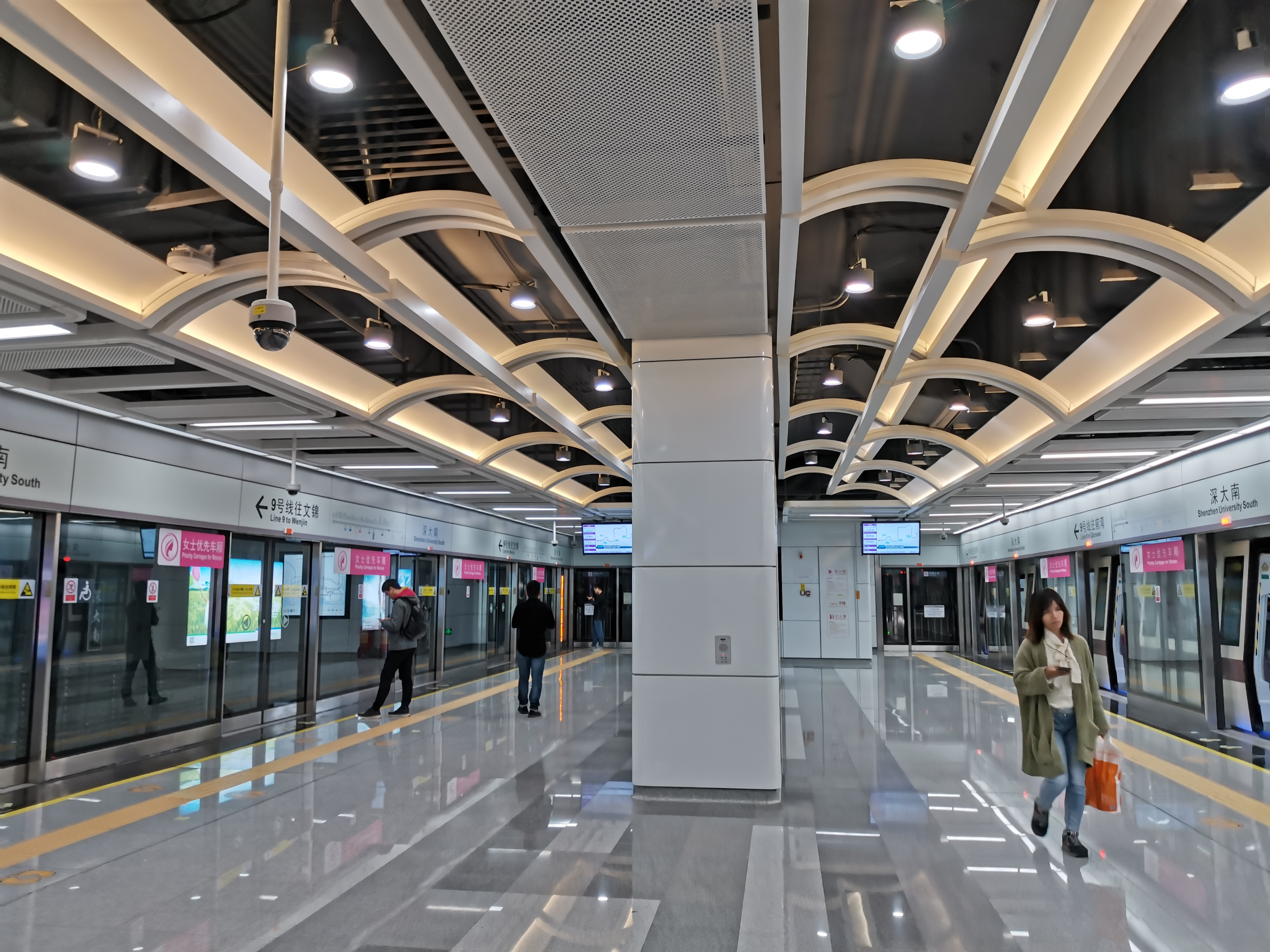

General information
- Location: Nanshan District, Shenzhen, Guangdong; China
- Operated by: SZMC (Shenzhen Metro Group)
- Line: Line 9

History
- Opened: 8 December 2019

Services
Preceding station	Shenzhen Metro	Following station
Yuehaimen towards Wenjin	Line 9	Nanshan Book Mall towards Qianwan
Location

Shenzhen University South station (Chinese: 深大南站; pinyin: Shēndà Nán Zhàn; Jyutping: sam1 daai6 naam4 zaam6) is a metro station of Shenzhen Metro Line 9. It opened on 8 December 2019.
