= Nanshan Book Mall station =

Metro station in Shenzhen, Guangdong, China

Coordinates: 22°31′46″N 113°59′6″E

Nanshan Book Mall 南山书城

General information
- Location: Nanshan District, Shenzhen, Guangdong; China
- Operated by: SZMC (Shenzhen Metro Group)
- Line: Line 9

History
- Opened: 8 December 2019

Services
| Preceding station | Shenzhen Metro | Following station |
|---|---|---|
| Shenzhen University South towards Wenjin | Line 9 | Nanyou towards Qianwan |
Location

Nanshan Book Mall station (Note: simplified Chinese: 南山书城站; traditional Chinese: 南山書城站; pinyin: Nánshān Shūchéng Zhàn; Jyutping: naam4 saan1 syu1 sing4 zaam6) is a metro station of Shenzhen Metro Line 9. It opened on 8 December 2019.
