= Ren Ren Le =

Chinese supermarket chain

Ren Ren Le Hypermarket
- Company type: Public
- Industry: Retail
- Founded: 1996
- Headquarters: Shenzhen, Guangdong
- Number of locations: 100+ (January 2016)
- Area served: China
- Products: Electronics, movies and music, home and furniture, home improvement, clothing, footwear, jewelry, shoes, toys, health and beauty, pet supplies, sporting goods and fitness, auto, photo finishing, craft supplies, party supplies, grocery.
- Website: http://www.renrenle.cn/rrlcs/

Ren Ren Le
- Simplified Chinese: 人人乐
- Traditional Chinese: 人人樂
Transcriptions
Standard Mandarin
- Hanyu Pinyin: Rénrénlè

Ren Ren Le (人人乐) is a supermarket chain based in Shenzhen, China.

Founded in April 1996, the supermarket chain has supermarkets in numerous Chinese cities, including Shenzhen and Xiamen, where a new 12,000 square meters store was opened in 2010.

As of 2008, Ren Ren Le had opened about one hundred hypermarkets and community supermarkets in 23 Chinese cities in the southern area, northwestern area, southwestern area and north area of China. In 2008, the company had an annual revenue of over CNY6 billion.

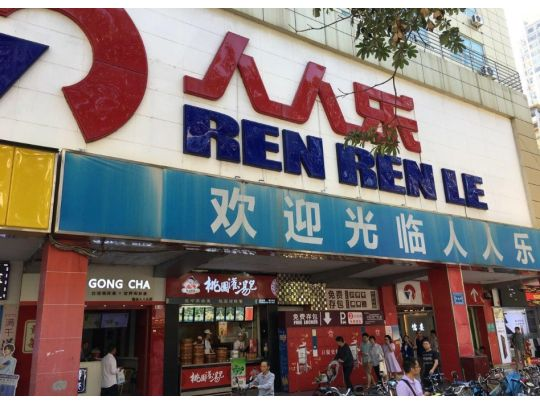
The Ren Ren Le in Nanshui, Shenzhen

As of March 2016, Ren Ren Le had 24 outlets in Shenzhen alone.
