= Port of Shenzhen =

Coordinates: 22°30′N 113°53′E

Port of Shenzhen 深圳港
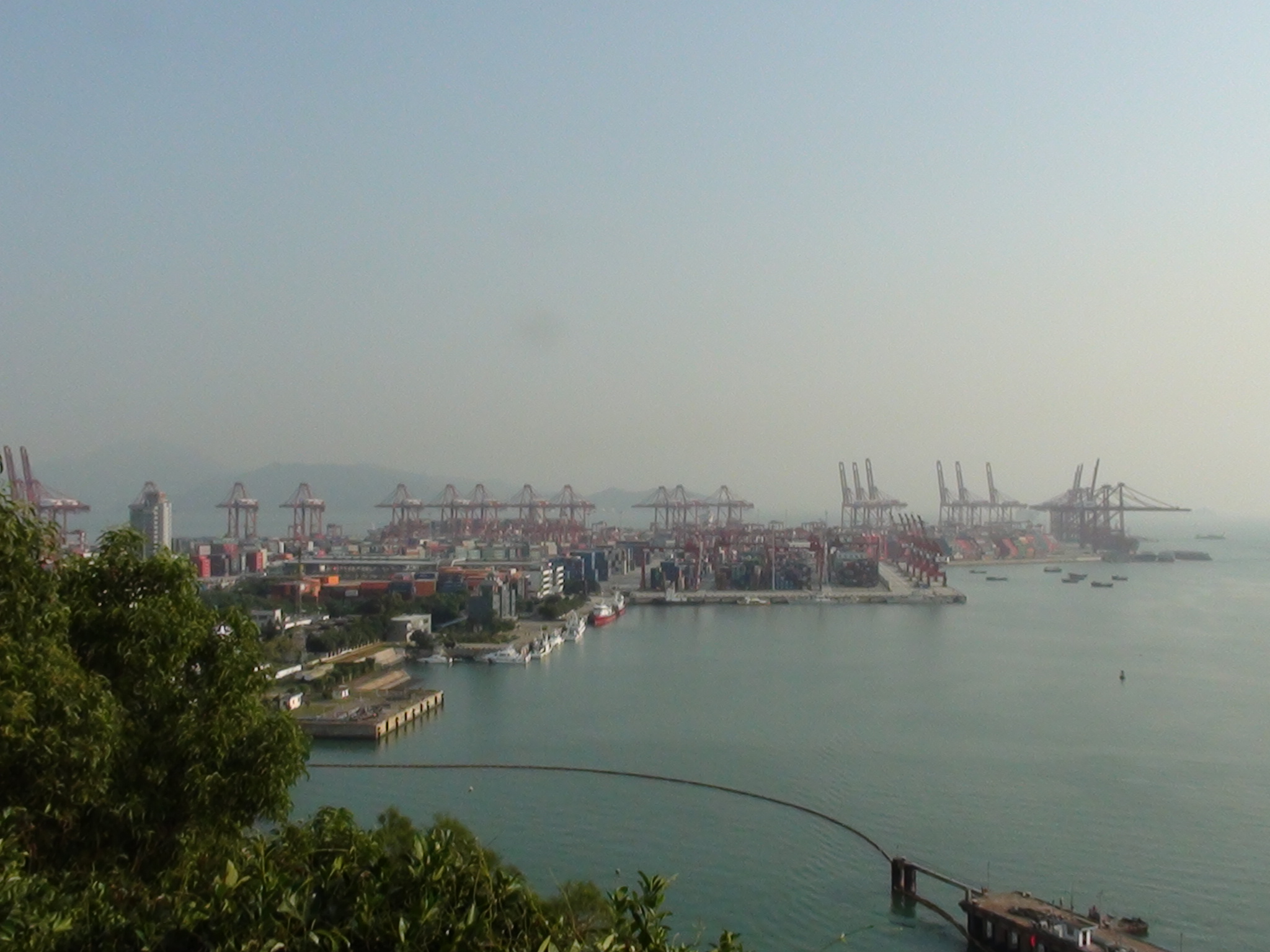

- Location in China

Location
- Country: People's Republic of China
- Location: Shenzhen, Guangdong

Details
- Owned by: Shenzhen Government

Port of Shenzhen
- Simplified Chinese: 深圳港
- Traditional Chinese: 深圳港
Transcriptions
Standard Mandarin
- Hanyu Pinyin: Shēnzhèn Gǎng
- Wade–Giles: Shen-chen kang
Yue: Cantonese
- Yale Romanization: SāmJan Góng
- Jyutping: Sam^{1}zan^{3} Gong^{2}

The Port of Shenzhen is the collective name of a number of ports the coastline of Shenzhen, Guangdong Province, China. These ports as a whole form one of the busiest and fastest growing container ports in the world.

The port is home to 40 shipping companies who have launched around 130 international container routes. There are 560 ships on call at Shenzhen port on a monthly basis and also 21 feeder routes to other ports in the Pearl River Delta region. The Shekou Cruise Center provides ferry services across the Pearl River Delta to places such as Hong Kong, Macau, and Zhuhai; it replaced the Shekou Passenger Terminal in 2016.

== History ==
Shenzhen's port system is currently the third largest port in China and one of the busiest container ports in the world, seeing traffic of 30,036,000 twenty-foot equivalent units (TEUs) in 2022. It was formerly the second largest port in China; however, it fell behind the Port of Ningbo-Zhoushan and has not recovered its position since.

The Port of Shenzhen is part of the 21st Century Maritime Silk Road, an initiative by China to increase investment and encourage economic collaboration along the historic routes of the maritime Silk Road.

== Geography ==
The many ports of Shenzhen are spread along Shenzhen's 260 kilometres (160 mi) coastline. The ports are separated by the New Territories and the Kowloon Peninsula of Hong Kong into two areas: the eastern port and the western port.

Shenzhen's western port area is located to the east of Lingdingyang in the Pearl River Estuary, consisting of a deep water harbor with natural shelters. The western port area is connected to the Pearl River region, with access to the cities and counties along the Pearl River, including Hong Kong and Guangzhou.

The eastern port area is situated north of Mirs Bay (also known as Dapeng Bay), where the harbors are broad and calm; it is claimed to be the best natural harbor in South China.

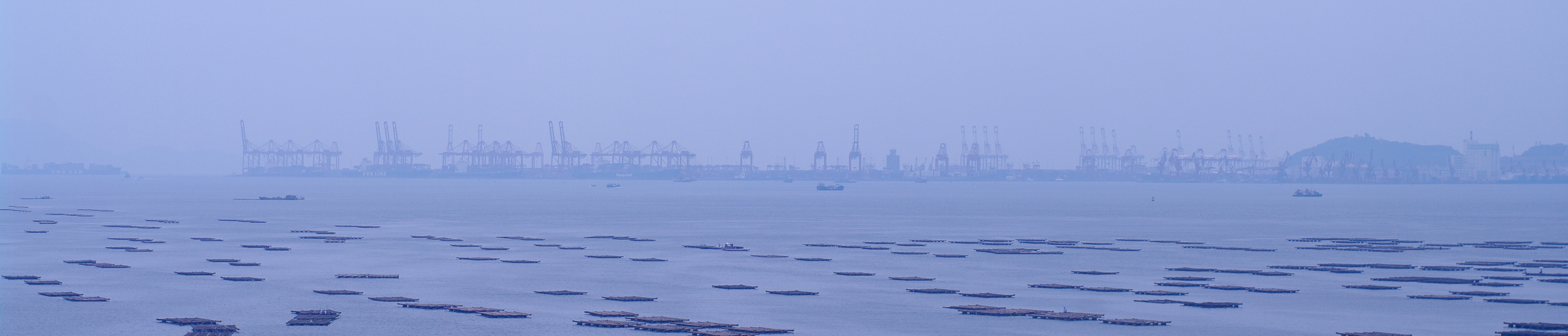
Port of Shenzhen viewed from Shenzhen Bay

== Infrastructure ==
The Port of Shenzhen consists of six ports: the Yantian and Dapeng port areas in the east, and the Nanshan, Dachan Bay, Dachan Island, Xiaochan Island, and Bao'an port areas in the west.

It has a total of 140 berths, including: 51 berths for vessels with 10,000 tonnes deadweight (DWT) and above; 90 operational berths, of which 43 are of 10,000 DWT or above; 18 container berths; 9 consignee berths, of which 3 are of 10,000 DWT or above; 18 passenger ferry berths; and 23 non-production berths.

The Shekou Cruise Center, located in Shekou, Nanshan District, provides ferry connections to destinations across the Pearl River Delta. It opened on November 13, 2016, replacing the old Shekou Passenger Terminal. It includes six regular high-speed ferry routes to and from the Hong Kong International Airport, Central, Hong Kong, the Macau Outer Harbor, Taipa, Macau, Zhuhai, and Wai Lingding Island. There are also flexible, non-regular routes to surrounding islands.

== Sister ports ==
- Port of Santa Cruz de Tenerife, Spain

== See also ==
- Hong Kong-Shenzhen Western Corridor
