= Shenzhen Ferry Terminal =

Shenzhen Ferry Terminal may refer to:

- Fuyong Ferry Terminal
- Shenzhen Cruise Center (the current Shenzhen Ferry Terminal)
- Shekou Ferry Terminal (old)
