= China Merchants Shenzhen Xunlong Shipping Co. Ltd =

Chinese ferry company

China Merchants Shenzhen Xunlong Shipping Company Limited 深圳迅隆船务有限公司
- Company type: State-owned enterprise
- Industry: Shipping
- Founded: 1993
- Headquarters: Shenzhen, People's Republic of China
- Area served: Pearl River Delta
- Products: Ferry Transportation
- Owner: China Merchants Group
- Parent: China Merchants Group
- Website: China Merchants Shenzhen Xunlong Shipping Company Limited

China Merchants Shenzhen Xunlong Shipping Co. Ltd., otherwise known as Xunlong Shipping or Xunlong Ferries, operates high speed catamaran ferry services from Shenzhen, Guangdong, China. It is a part of the China Merchants Group.

== History ==
Established in November, 1993 and commenced commercial operations in October 1995.

== Routes and ports ==
Home Terminal in Shenzhen:

- Shekou (蛇口), Shenzhen - Shekou Passenger Terminal (Until October 31, 2016)
- Shekou (蛇口), Shenzhen - Shenzhen Prince Bay Cruise Homeport (From November 1, 2016)

Terminals in Hong Kong:

- Hong Kong China Ferry Terminal (中港城碼頭)
- Hong Kong–Macau Ferry Terminal (港澳碼頭)
- Skypier at Hong Kong International Airport (海天碼頭)

Terminals in Macau:

- Outer Harbour Ferry Terminal
- Taipa Temporary Ferry Terminal

Terminal in Zhuhai, China

- Jiuzhou Port (珠海九洲港)

== Fleet ==
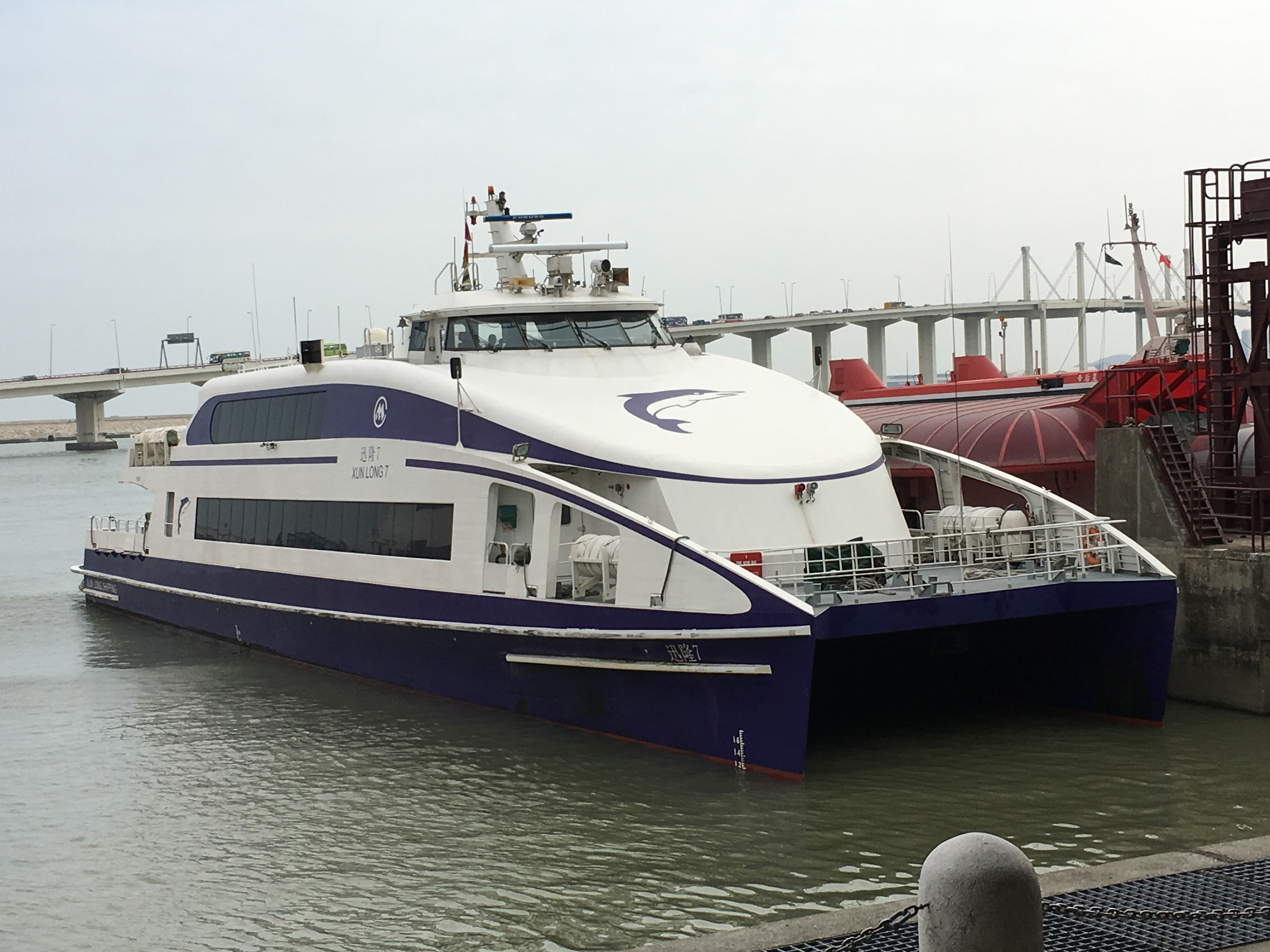
Xunlong 7

There are 8 high speed catamaran ferries in the fleet, which are a mix of Australian and Norwegian built vessels. They serve 60 services per day.

Vessel Name	Passenger Capacity
Xunlong 1	304
Xunlong 2	356
Xunlong 3	224
Xunlong 4	224
Xunlong 5	188
Xunlong 6	188
Xunlong 7	296
Taishan	318

A new ferry with a capacity of 234 passengers was ordered from Dutch marine designers, CoCo Yachts. It is an aluminium catamaran, to be built by the shipyard Plenty Ships, due for delivery during 2016.
