= Shekou School =

School in Shenzhen, China

- Simplified Chinese: 深圳市蛇口学校
- Traditional Chinese: 深圳市蛇口學校
Transcriptions
Standard Mandarin
- Hanyu Pinyin: Shēnzhènshì Shékǒu Xuéxiào
Yue: Cantonese
- Jyutping: sam1 zan3 si5 se4 hau2 hok6 haau6

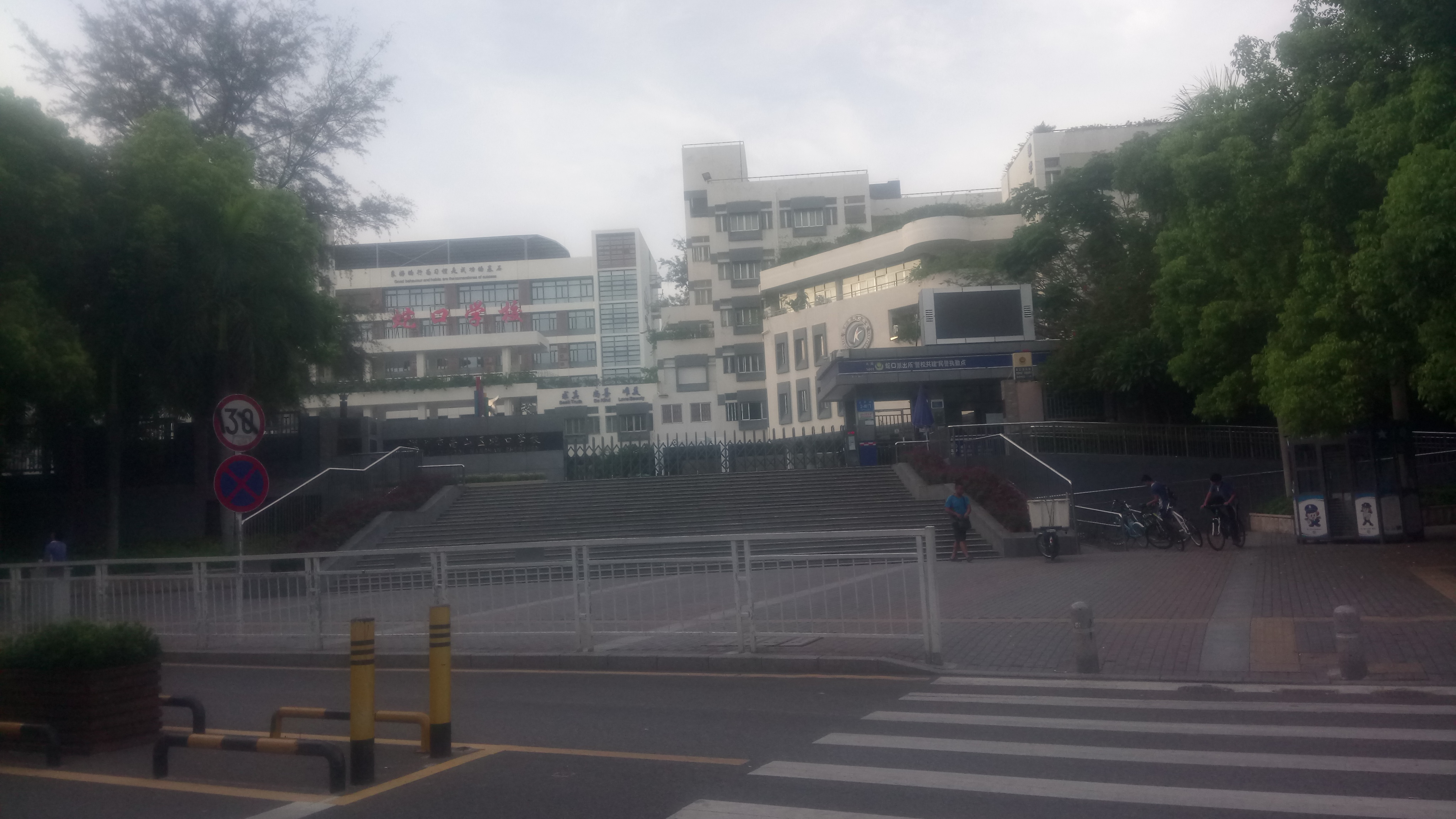
Shekou School

Shekou School Shenzhen is a primary and secondary school in the Shekou area of Nanshan District, Shenzhen, China.

It was formed in 2003 by the merger of Shekou Primary School, (Note: 蛇口小学; 蛇口小學; Shékǒu Xiǎoxué; se4 hau2 siu2 hok6) which opened in 1945, and Shekou Secondary School, (Note: 蛇口中学; 蛇口中學; Shékǒu Zhōngxué; se4 hau2 zung1 hok6) which opened in 1970.
