= Sea World station =

Shenzhen Metro Line 2 and Line 12 station

Sea World 海上世界
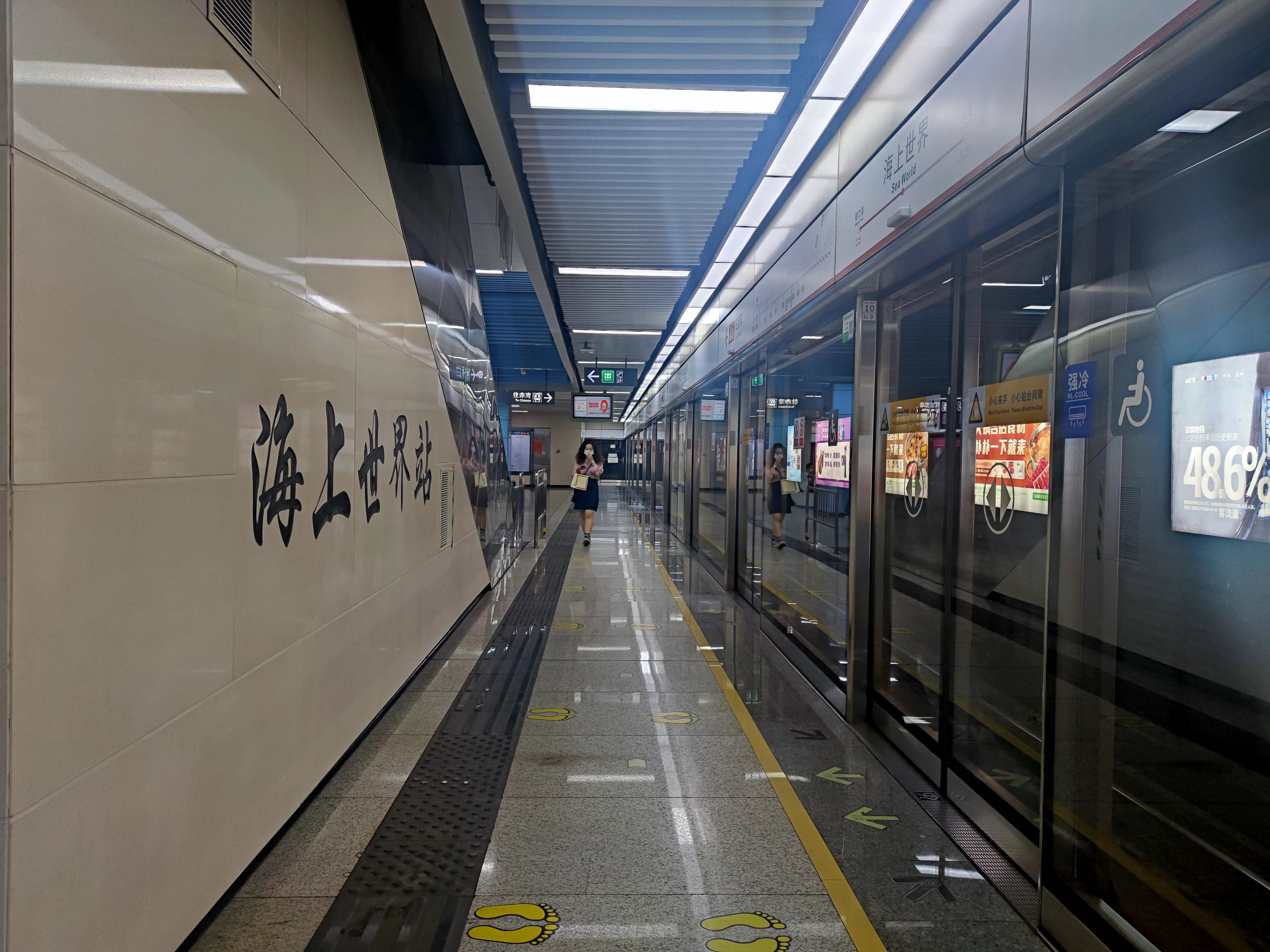
- Line 2 platform (November 2022)

Chinese name
- Chinese: 海上世界
Transcriptions
Standard Mandarin
- Hanyu Pinyin: Hǎishàng Shìjiè
Yue: Cantonese
- Yale Romanization: Hóiseuhng Sáigaíh
- Jyutping: Hoi2 Soeng6 Sai3 Gaai3

General information
- Location: Line 2: South of the intersection of Taizi Road and Gongye 3rd Road; Line 12: South of the intersection of Nanhai Boulevard and Gongye 3rd Road; Zhaoshang Subdistrict, Nanshan District, Shenzhen, Guangdong; China
- Coordinates: 22°29′17.20″N 113°54′36.97″E
- Operated by: SZMC (Shenzhen Metro Group); Shenzhen Line 12 Rail Transit Co., Ltd (Shenzhen Metro Group and PowerChina PPP)
- Lines: Line 2; Line 12
- Platforms: 4 (2 island platforms)
- Tracks: 4

Construction
- Structure type: Underground
- Accessible: Yes

History
- Opened: Line 2: 28 December 2010 (15 years ago); Line 12: 28 November 2022 (3 years ago)

Services
Preceding station	Shenzhen Metro	Following station
Shekou Port towards Chiwan	Line 2	Shuiwan towards Liantang (Line 8: Xichong)
Huaguoshan towards Songgang	Line 12	Taiziwan towards Zuopaotai East
Route map
Location

Sea World station (Chinese: 海上世界站; pinyin: Hǎishàng Shìjiè Zhàn; Jyutping: Hoi2 Soeng6 Sai3 Gaai3 Zaam6; Cantonese Yale: Hóiseuhng Sáigaíh Jaahm) is an interchange station for Line 2 and Line 12 of the Shenzhen Metro. Line 2 platforms opened on 28 December 2010 and Line 12 platforms opened on 28 November 2022. It is located close to the eastern edge of Shekou in Nanshan district of Shenzhen.

The underground station is located adjacent to Sea World, a tourist attraction with numerous restaurants and a large ship Minghua. It is also located close to a number of offices and banks, the sea walk at Sea World promenade, and Times plaza, one of the oldest high rise office buildings in Shekou.

== Station layout ==
G	-	Exit
B1F; Concourse	Lobby	Ticket machines, Customer Service, Station Control Room; Transfer passage between Line 2 and Line 12
B2F; Platforms	Platform	12 towards Songgang (Huaguoshan)
B2F; Platforms	Island platform, doors will open on the left
B2F; Platforms	Platform	12 towards Zuopaotai East (Taiziwan)
B2F; Platforms	Platform	2 towards Chiwan (Shekou Port)
B2F; Platforms	Island platform, doors will open on the left
B2F; Platforms	Platform	8 towards Xichong (Shuiwan)

=== Entrances/exits ===
The Line 2 station has 4 points of entry/exit, with Exit C being accessible via elevator. Exit D has toilets. The Line 12 station has 4 points of entry/exit, with Exits F and H being accessible via elevator. Exit H has toilets.

Exit	Destination
Exit A	Taizi Road (E), Xinghua Road (S), Sea World, Honglong Apartment, Seaview Plaza, Seaside Garden
Exit B	Taizi Road (W), Sea World, Huigang Shopping Center Phase 1
Exit C	Taizi Road (W), Sea World, Huigang Shopping Center Phase 2, Huada Building
Exit D	Taizi Road (W), Sea World, Huigang Shopping Center Phase 2, Taizi Square, New Century Square
Exit E	Nanhai Boulevard (E), Offshore Oil Building
Exit F	Nanhai Boulevard (E), Zhenxing Building, Jinyuan
Exit G	Nanhai Boulevard (W), Peak Seaview - Lanxi Valley, Nanshan Medical Device Industrial Park
Exit H	Nanhai Boulevard (W), Peak Seaview Villa, Guishan Garden, Minghua International Conference Center, Whale Mountain Villa

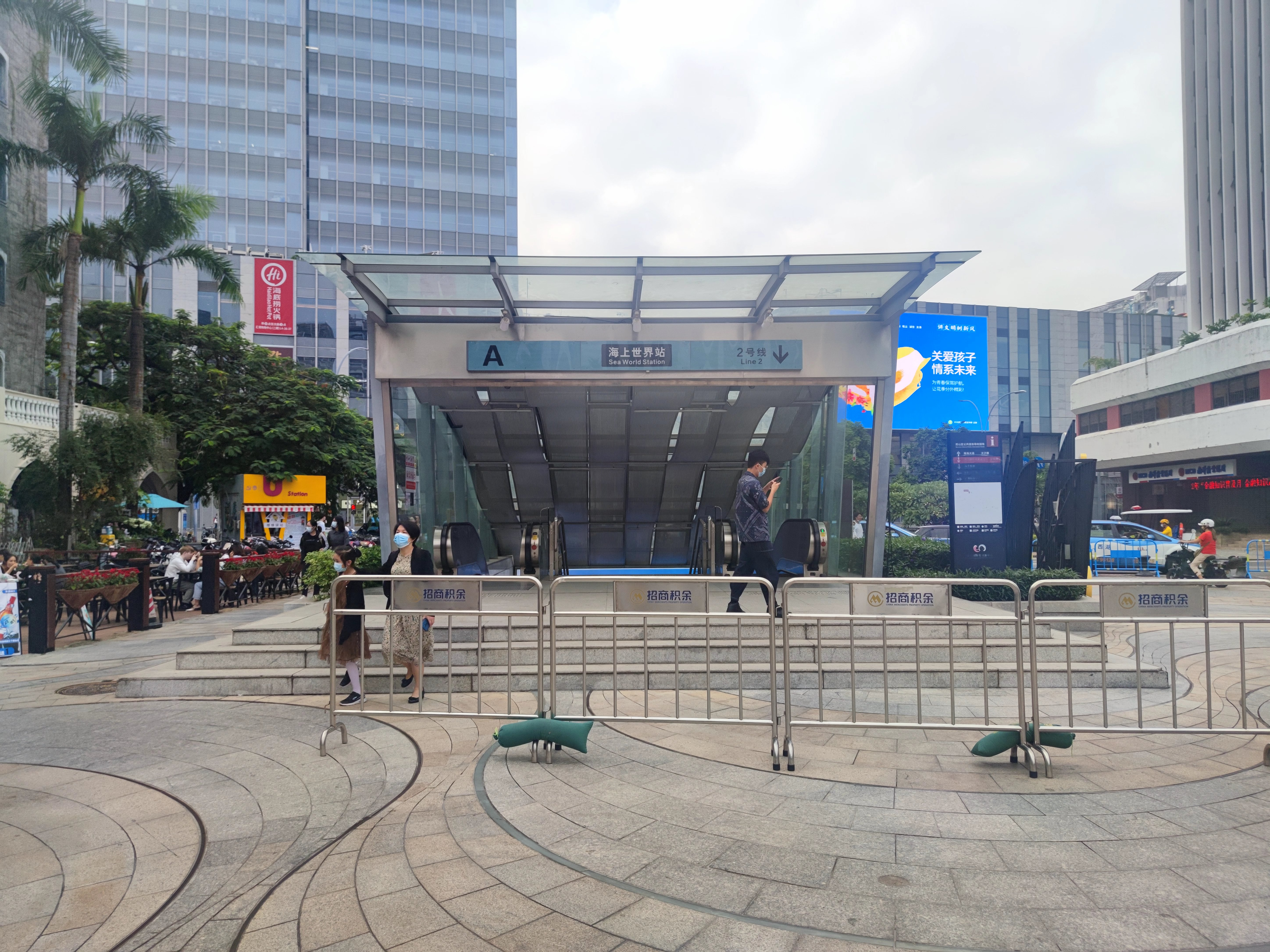
Entrance A

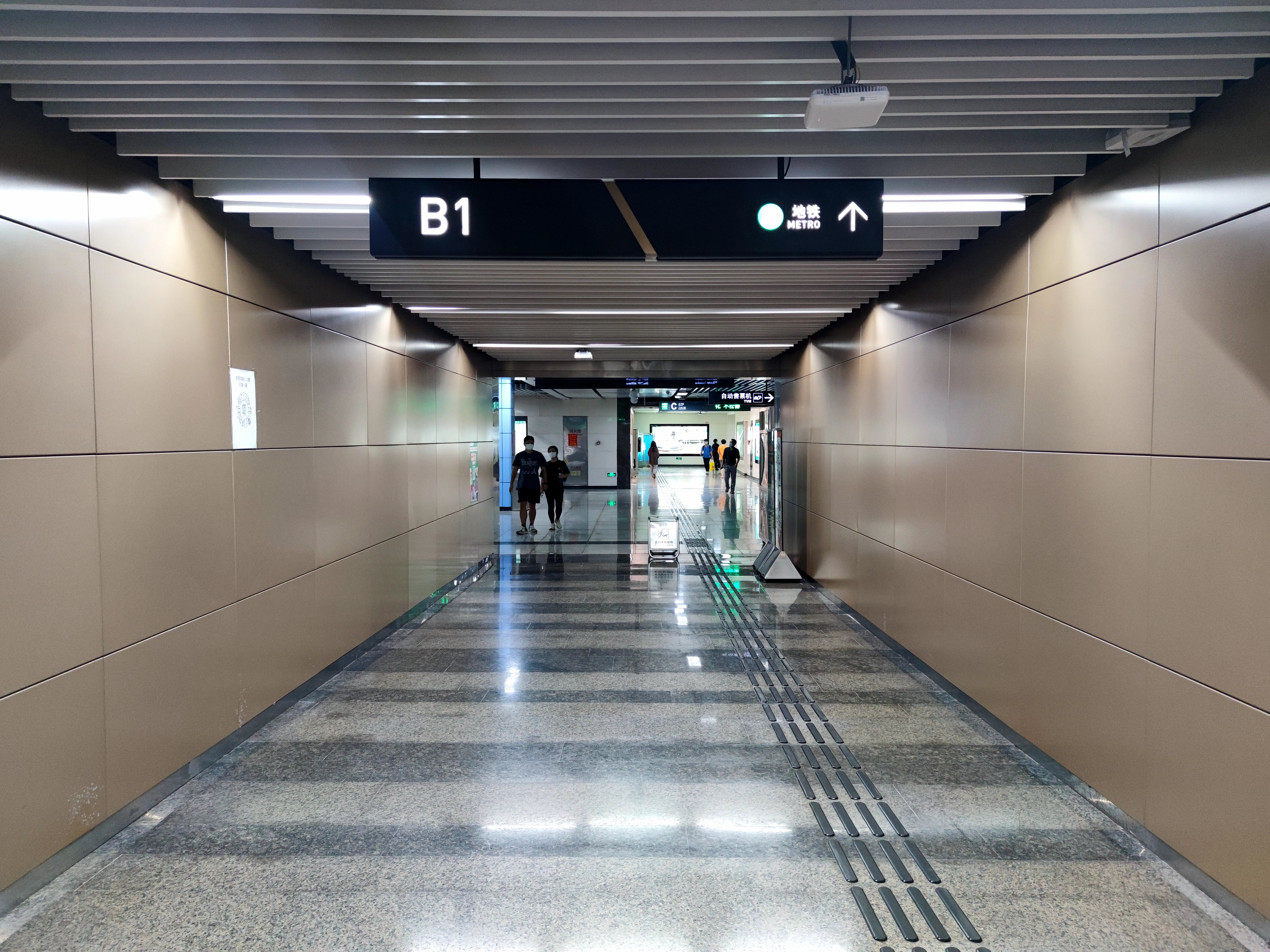
Entrance B

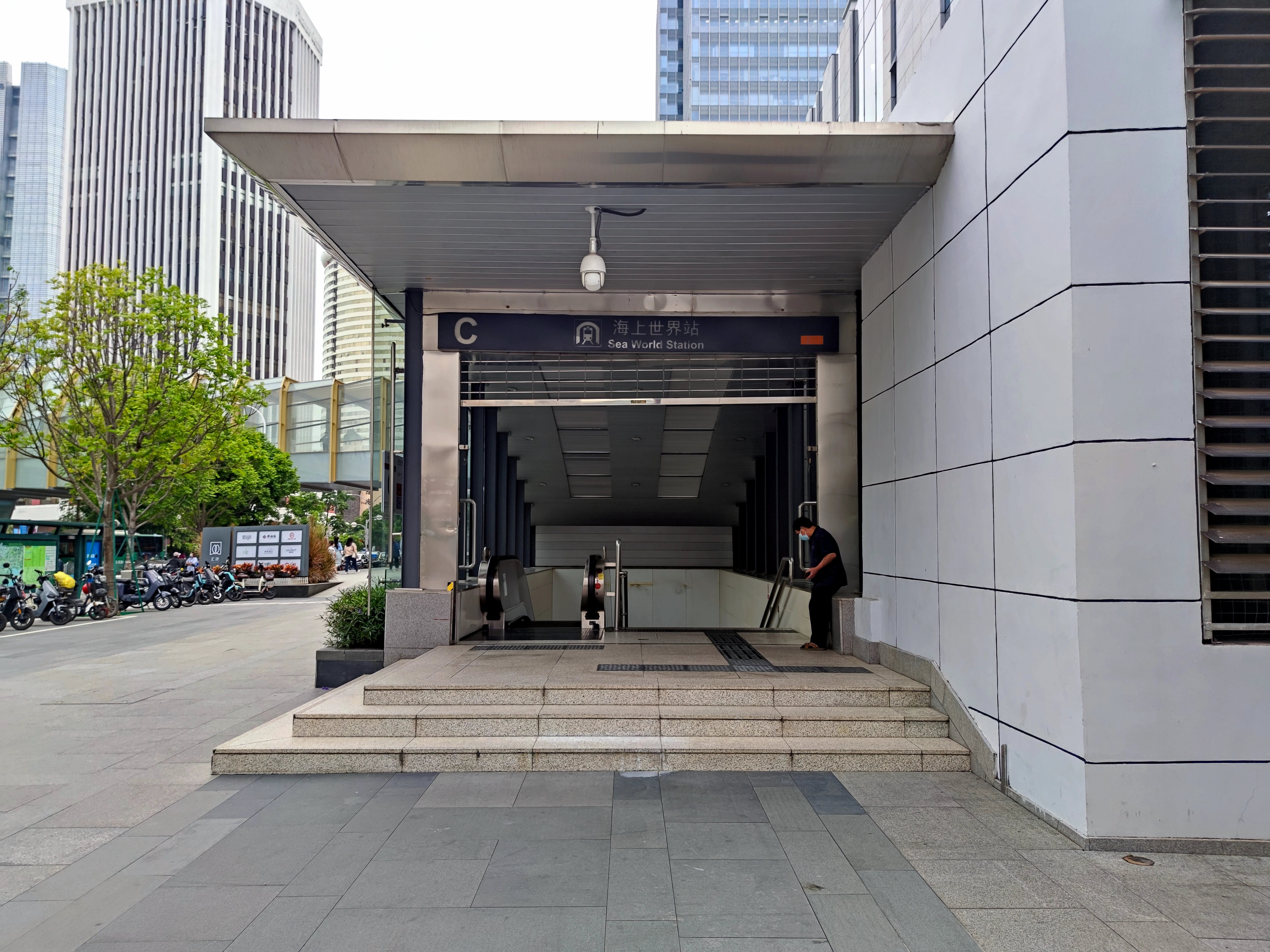
Entrance C

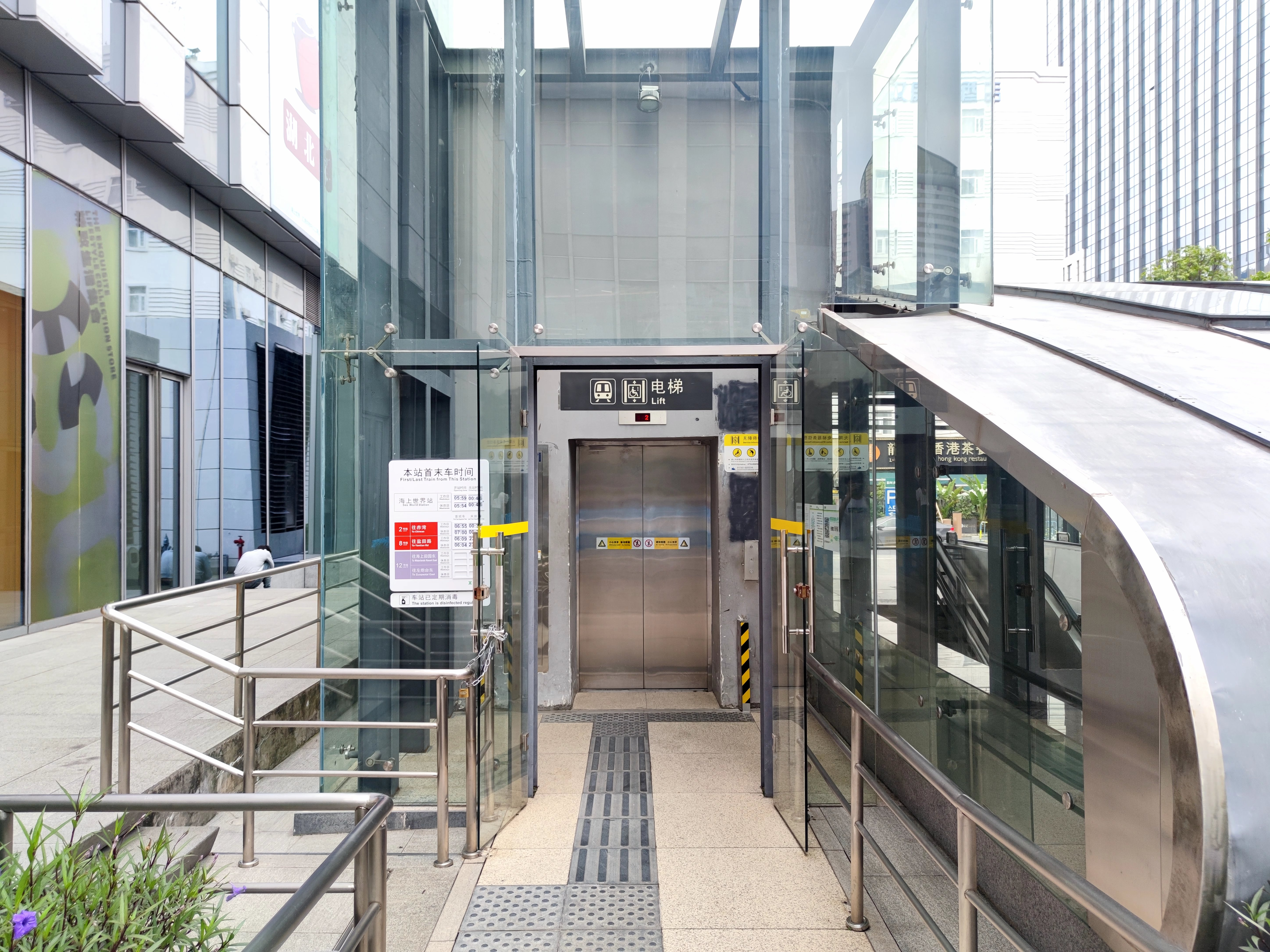
Entrance C (elevator entrance)

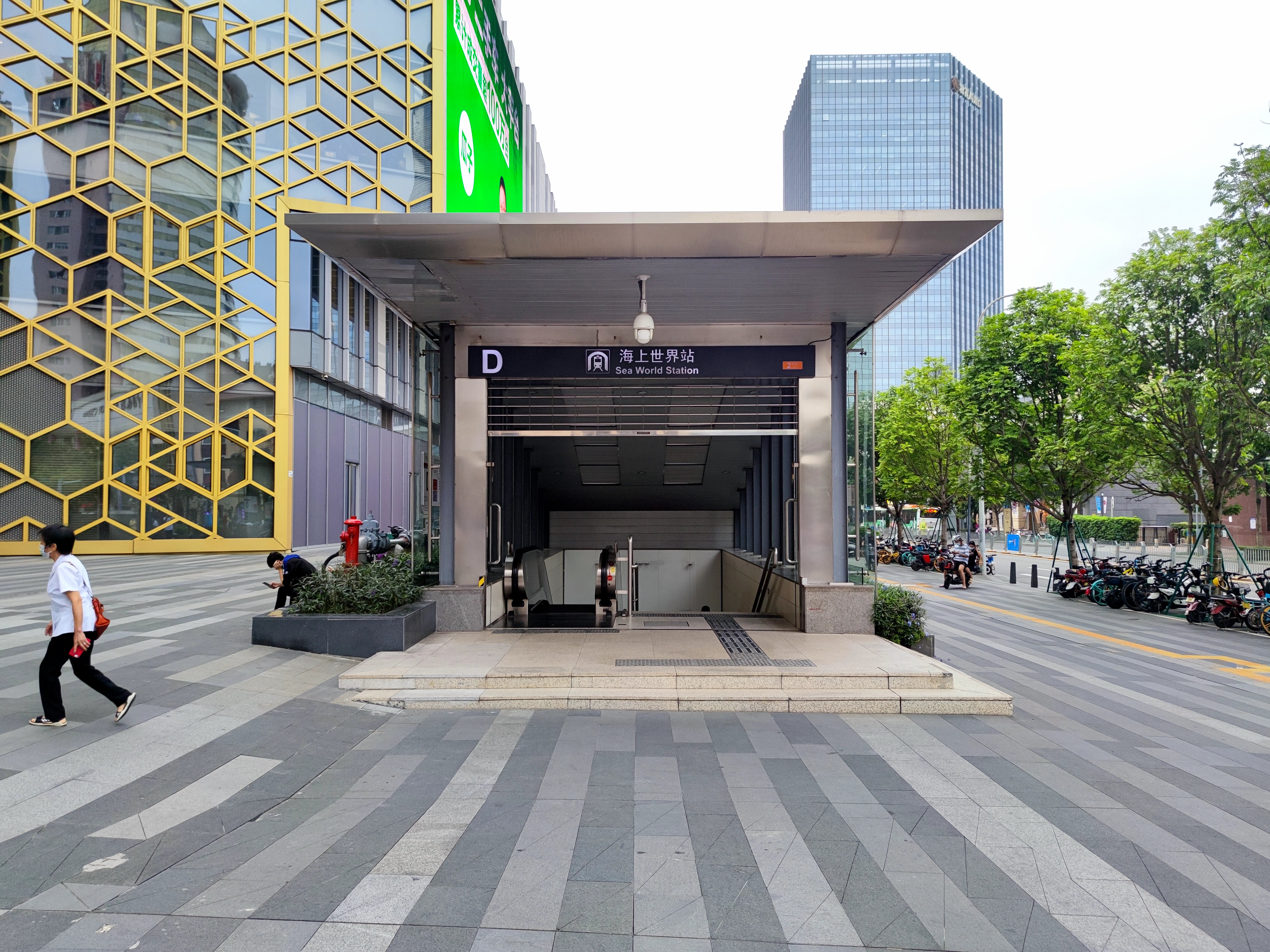
Entrance D

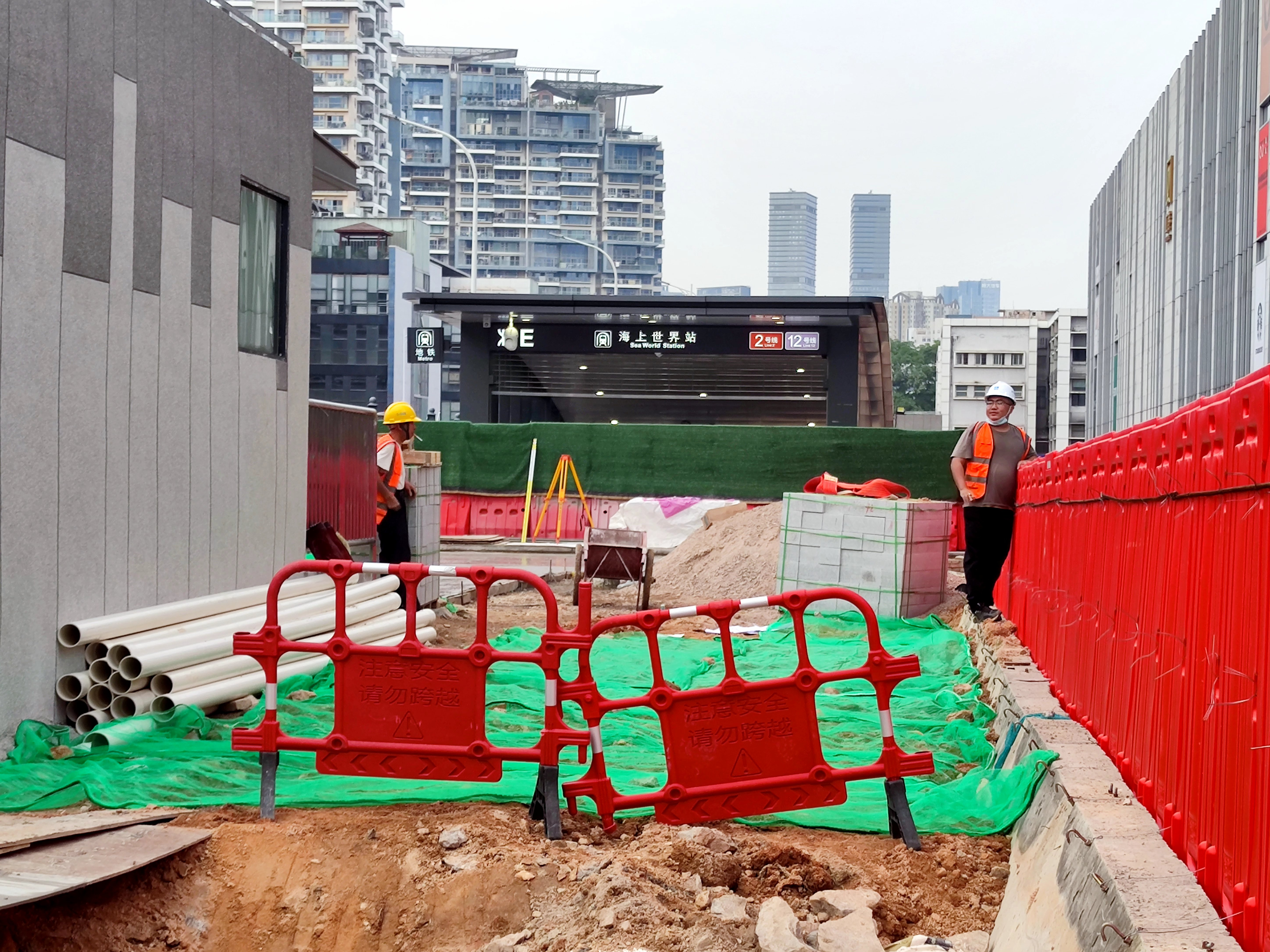
Entrance E

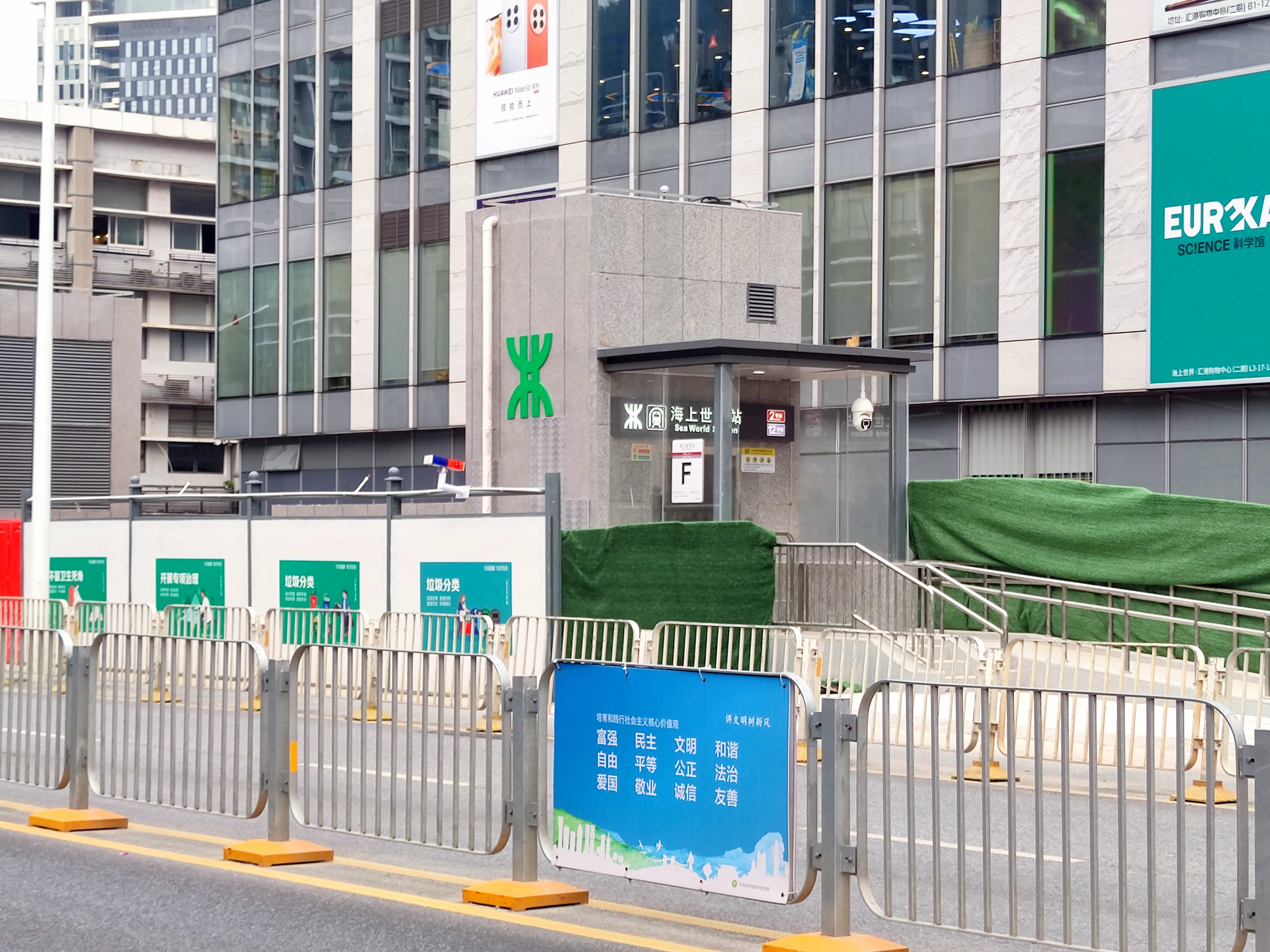
Entrance F

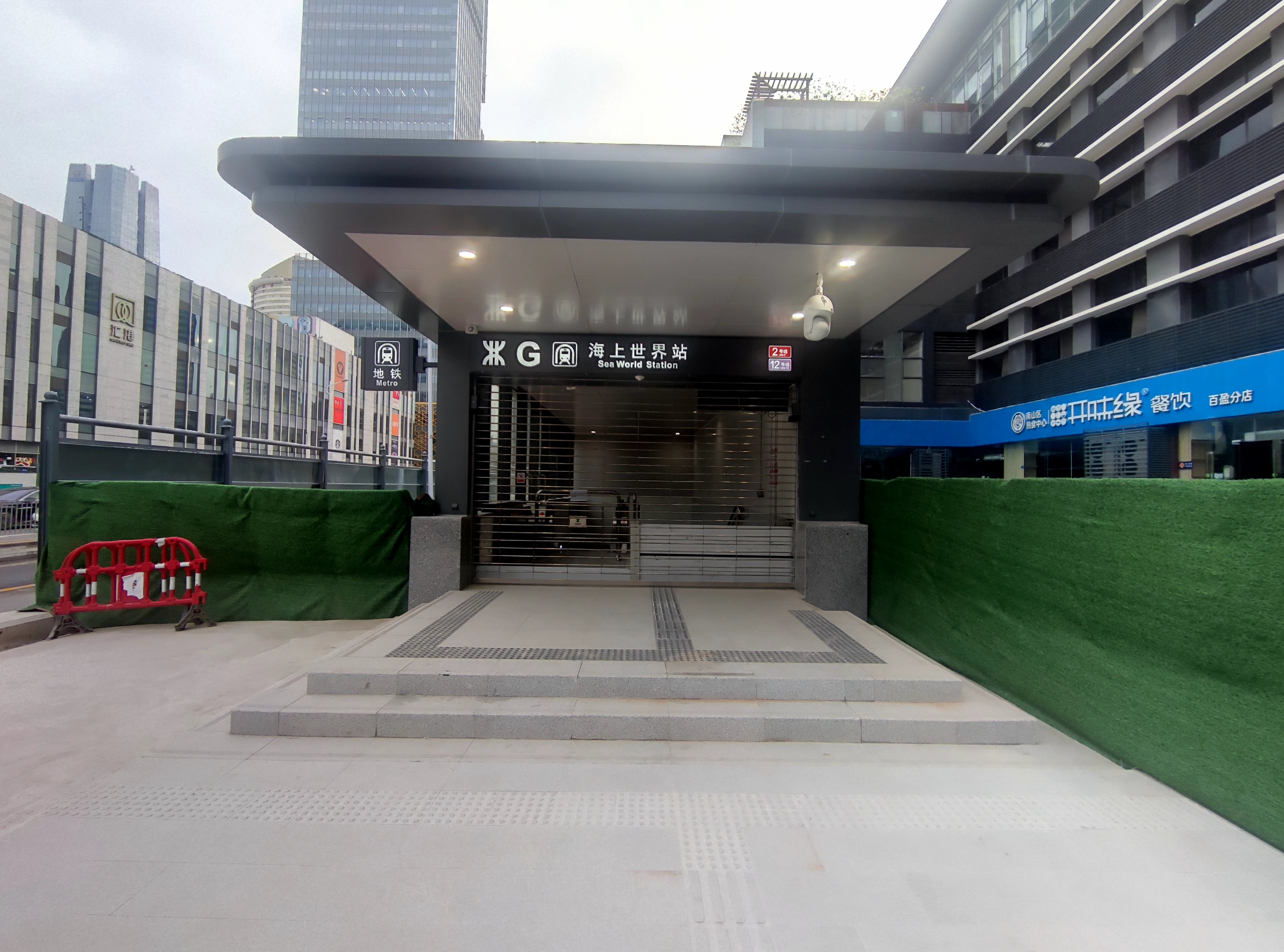
Entrance G

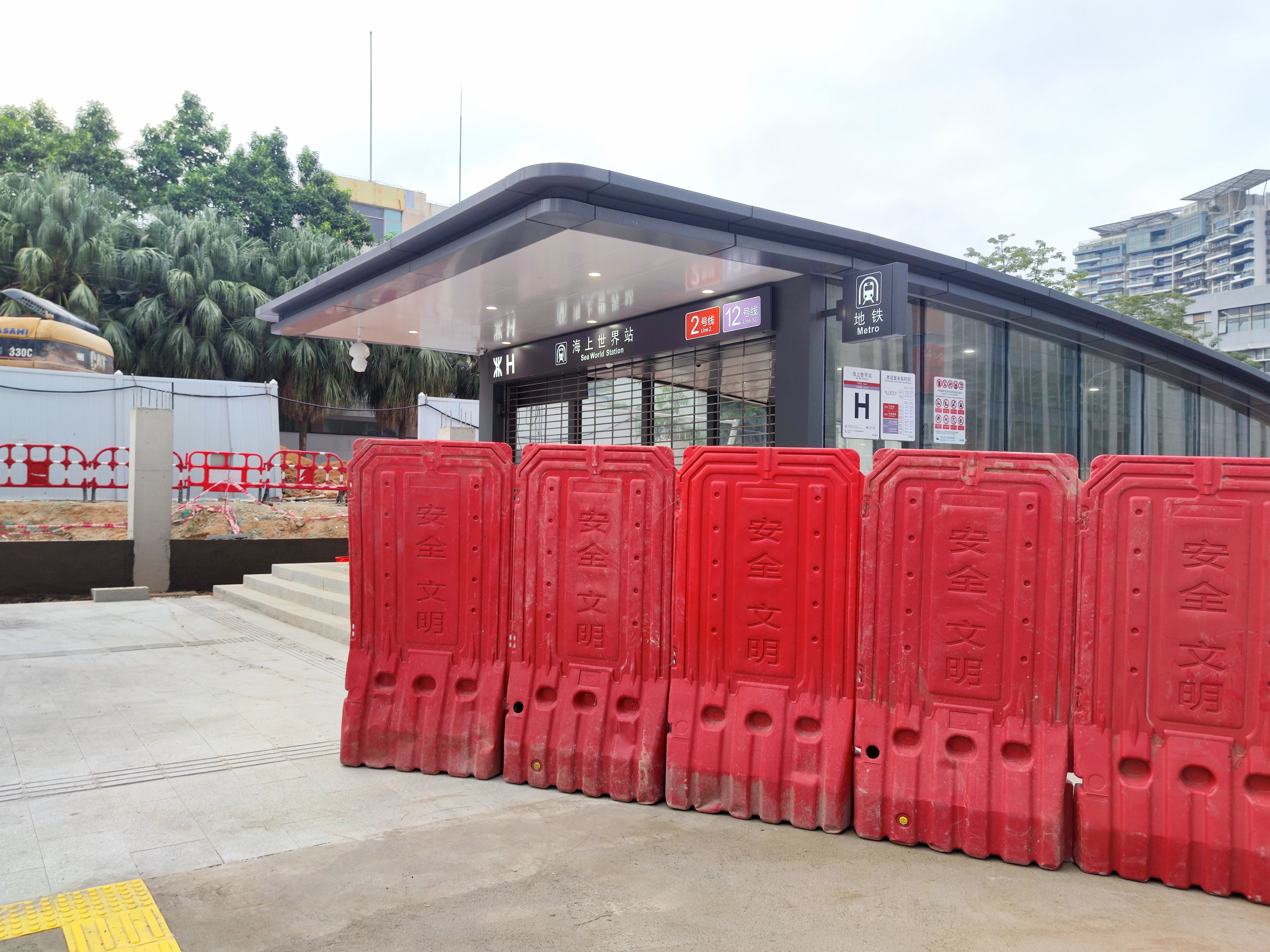
Entrance H

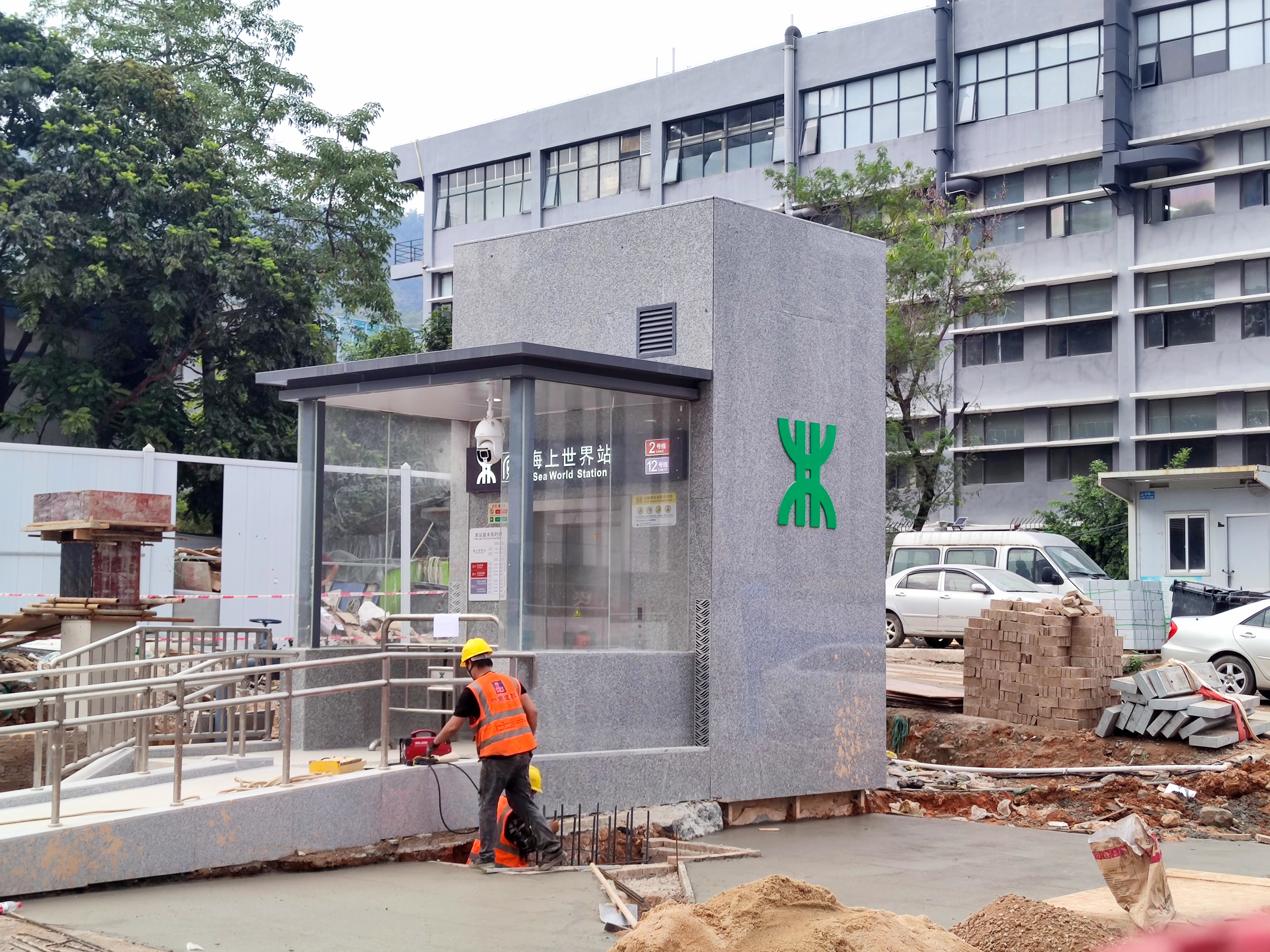
Entrance H (elevator entrance)

== Gallery ==
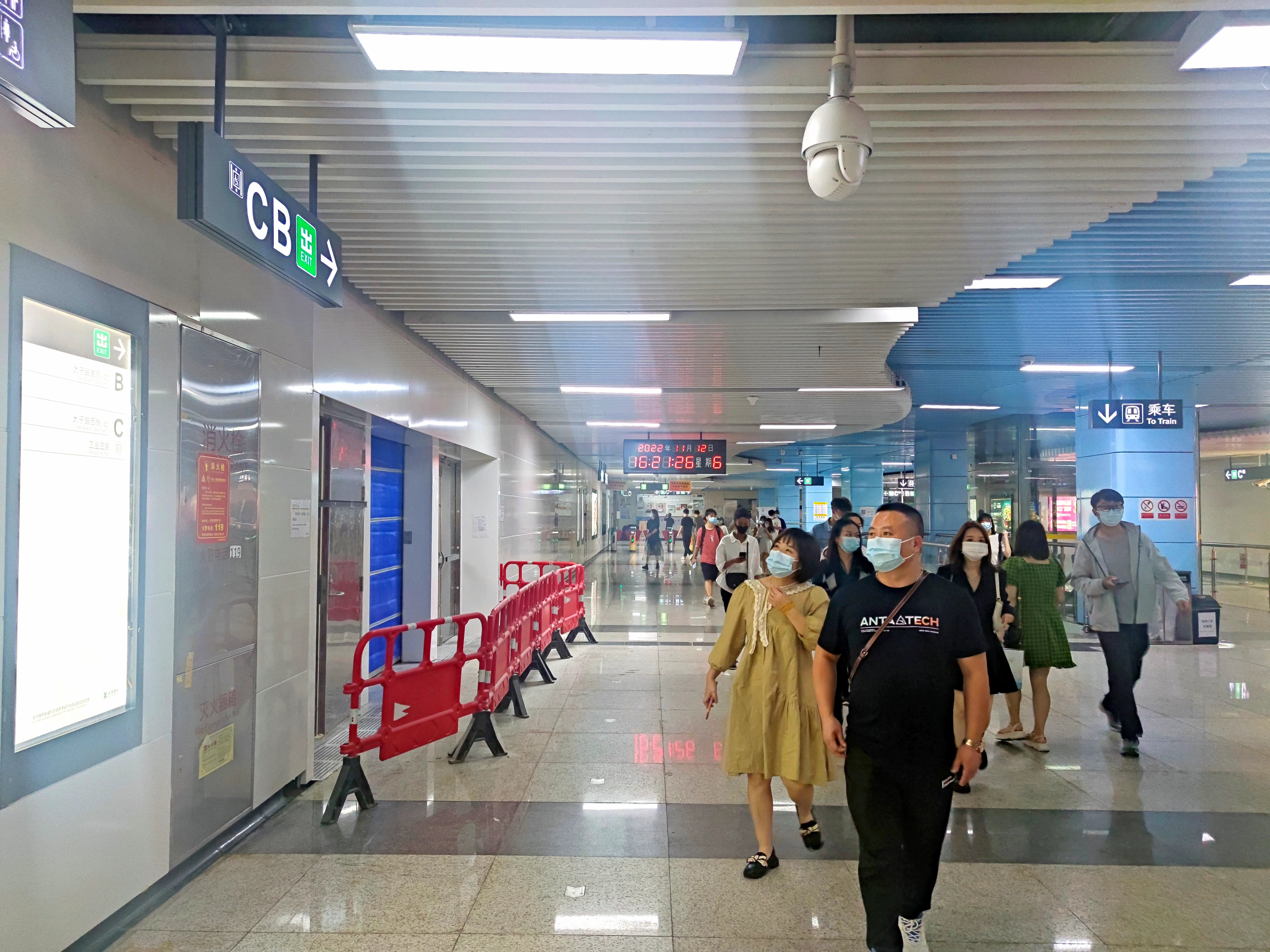
Line 2 concourse

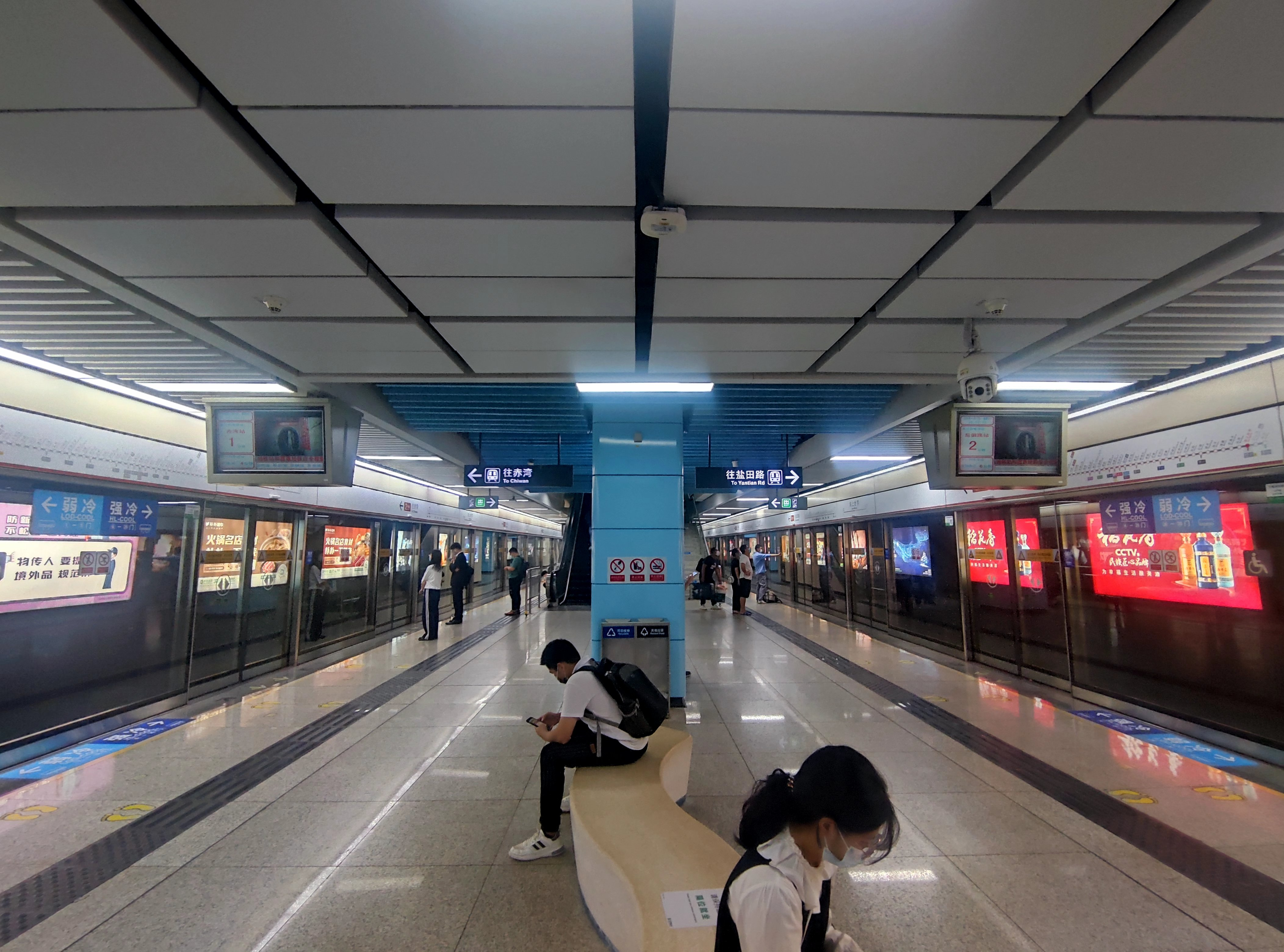
Line 2 platform

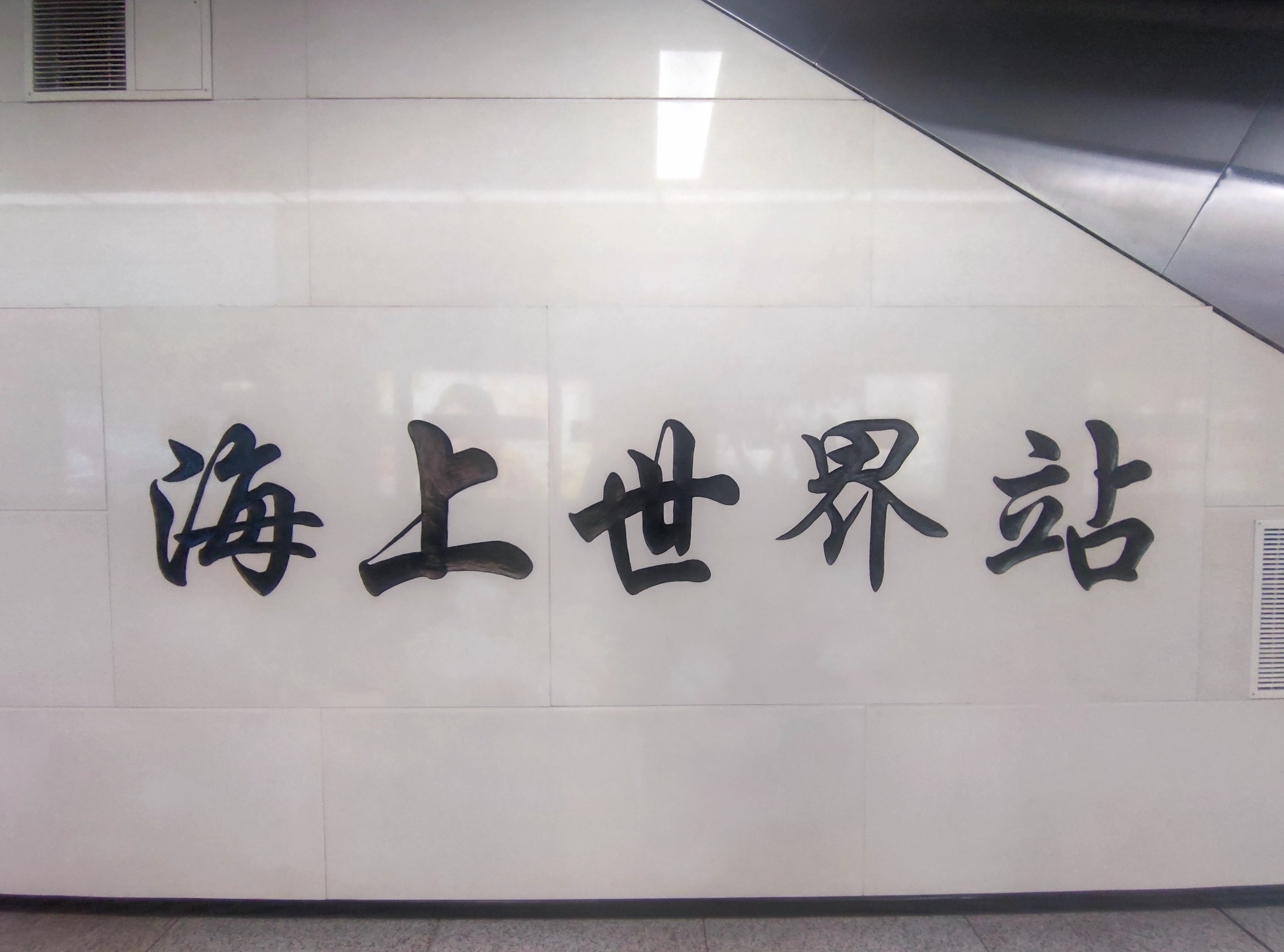
Line 2 calligraphy

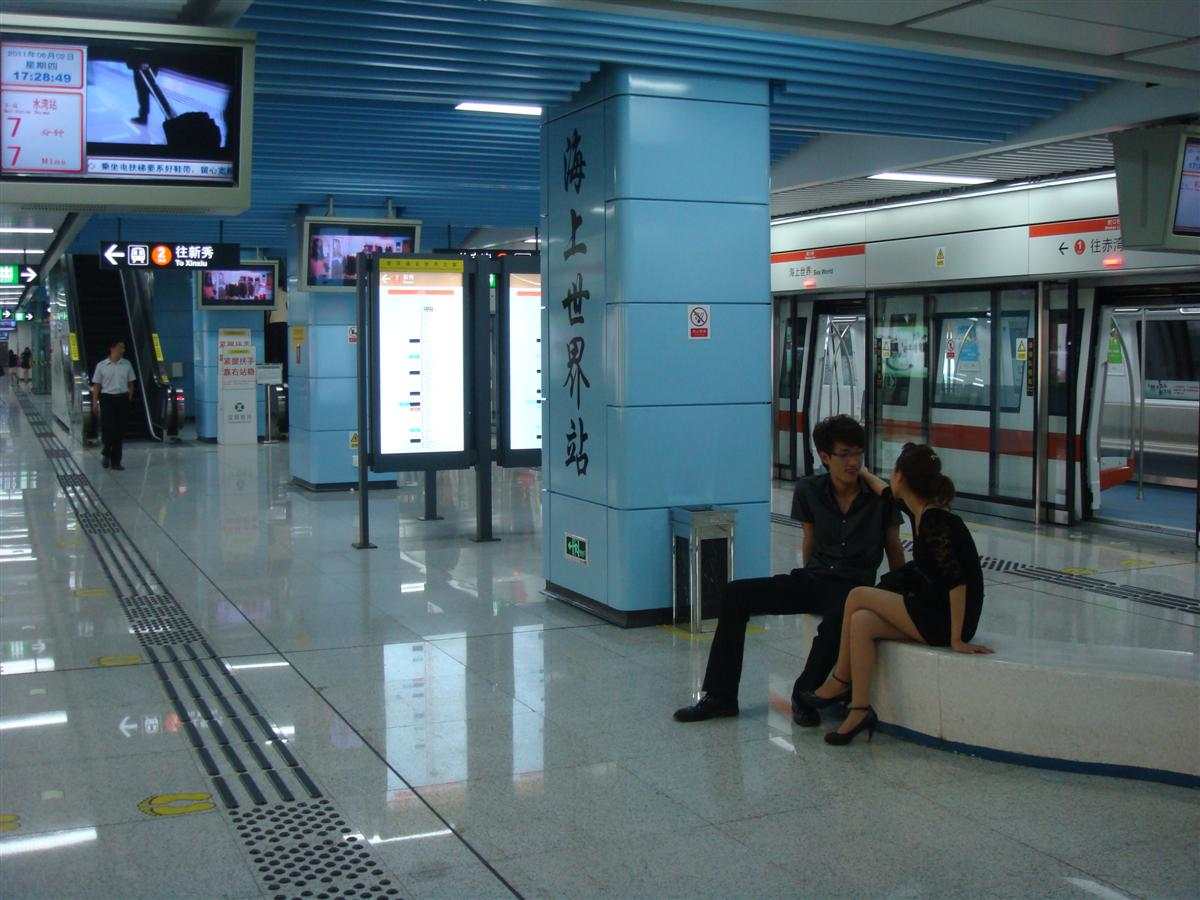
Line 2 platform shortly after opening in 2011

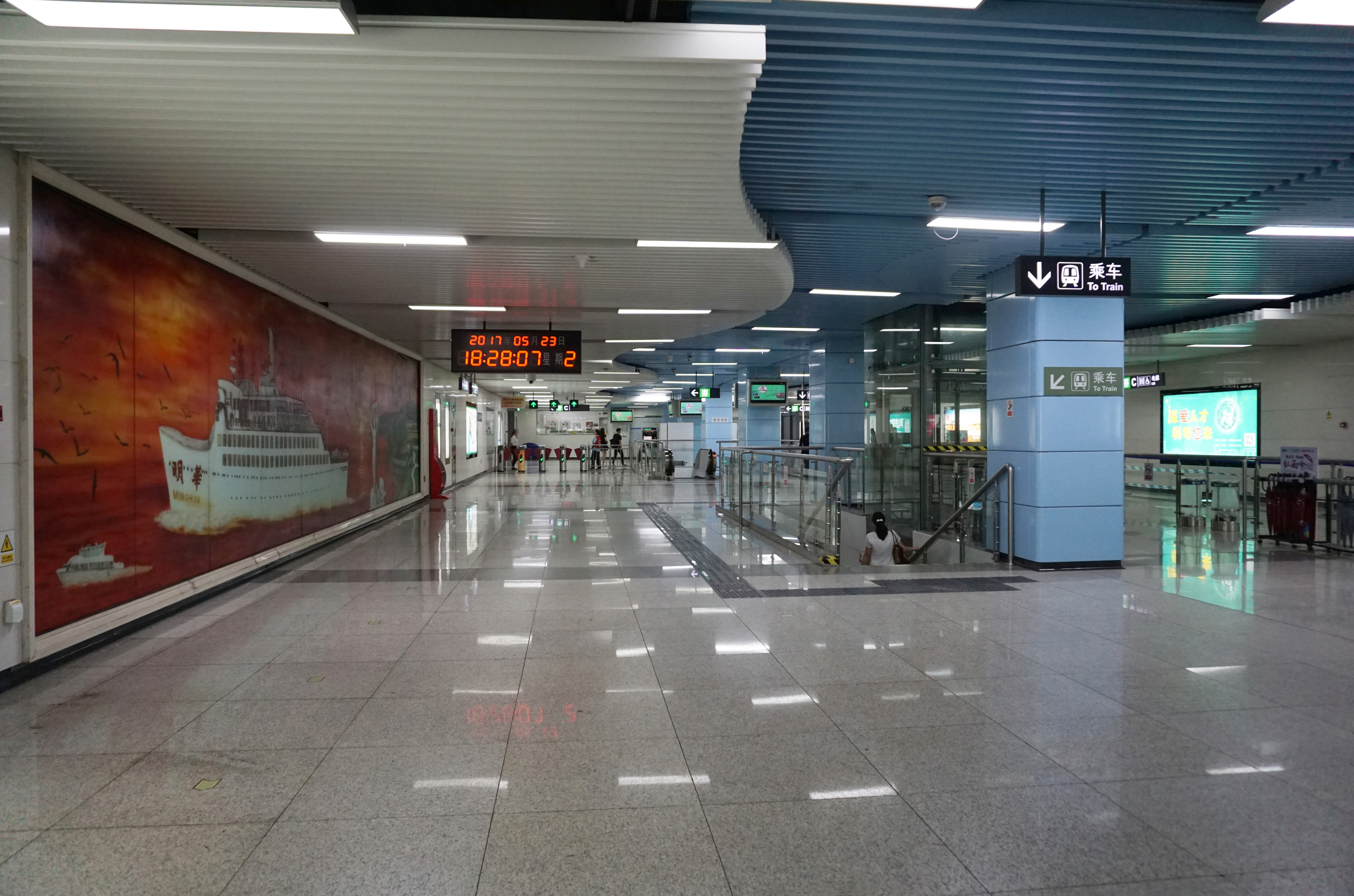
Line 2 concourse art wall in 2017 shortly before removal

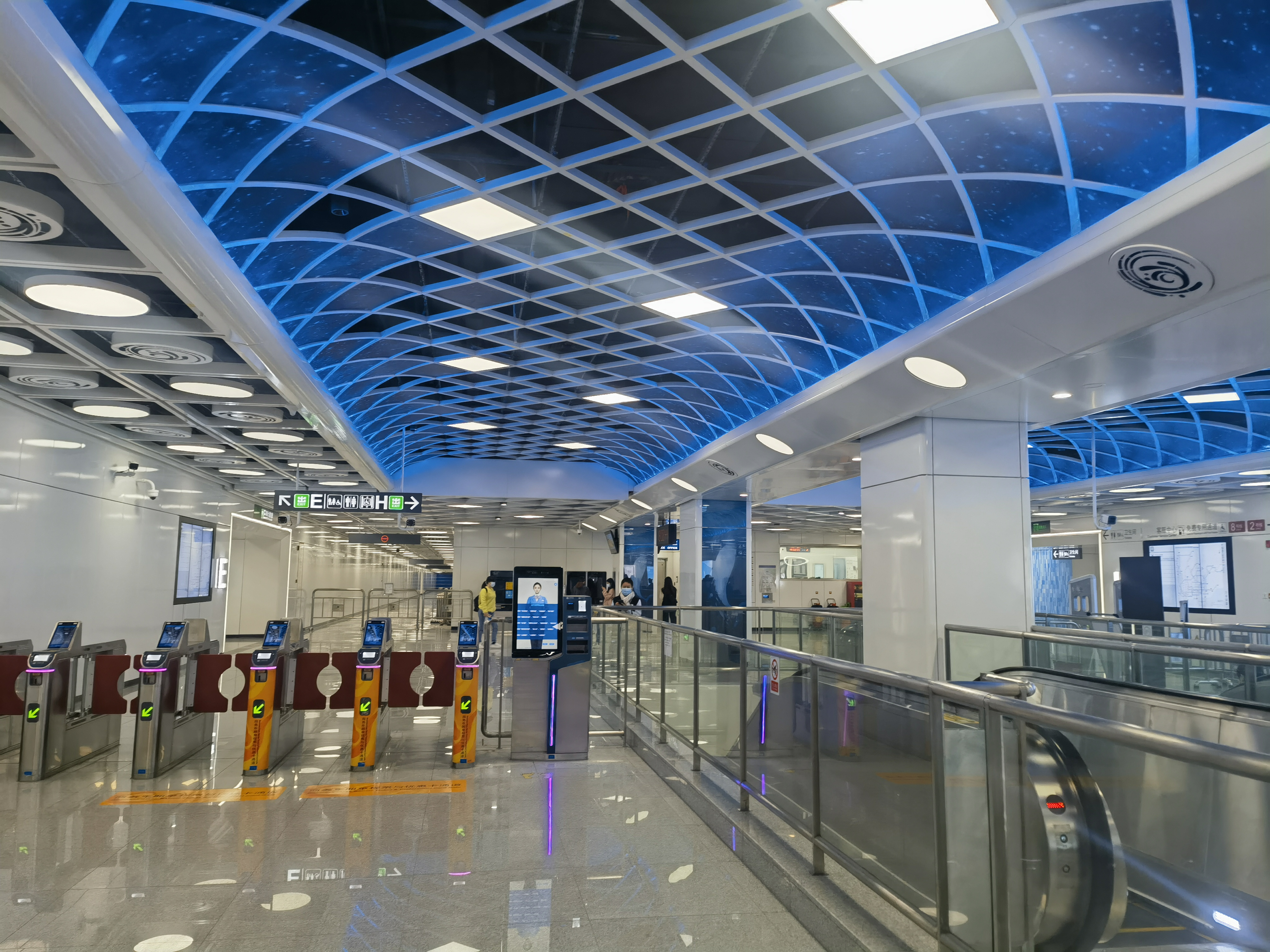
Line 12 concourse

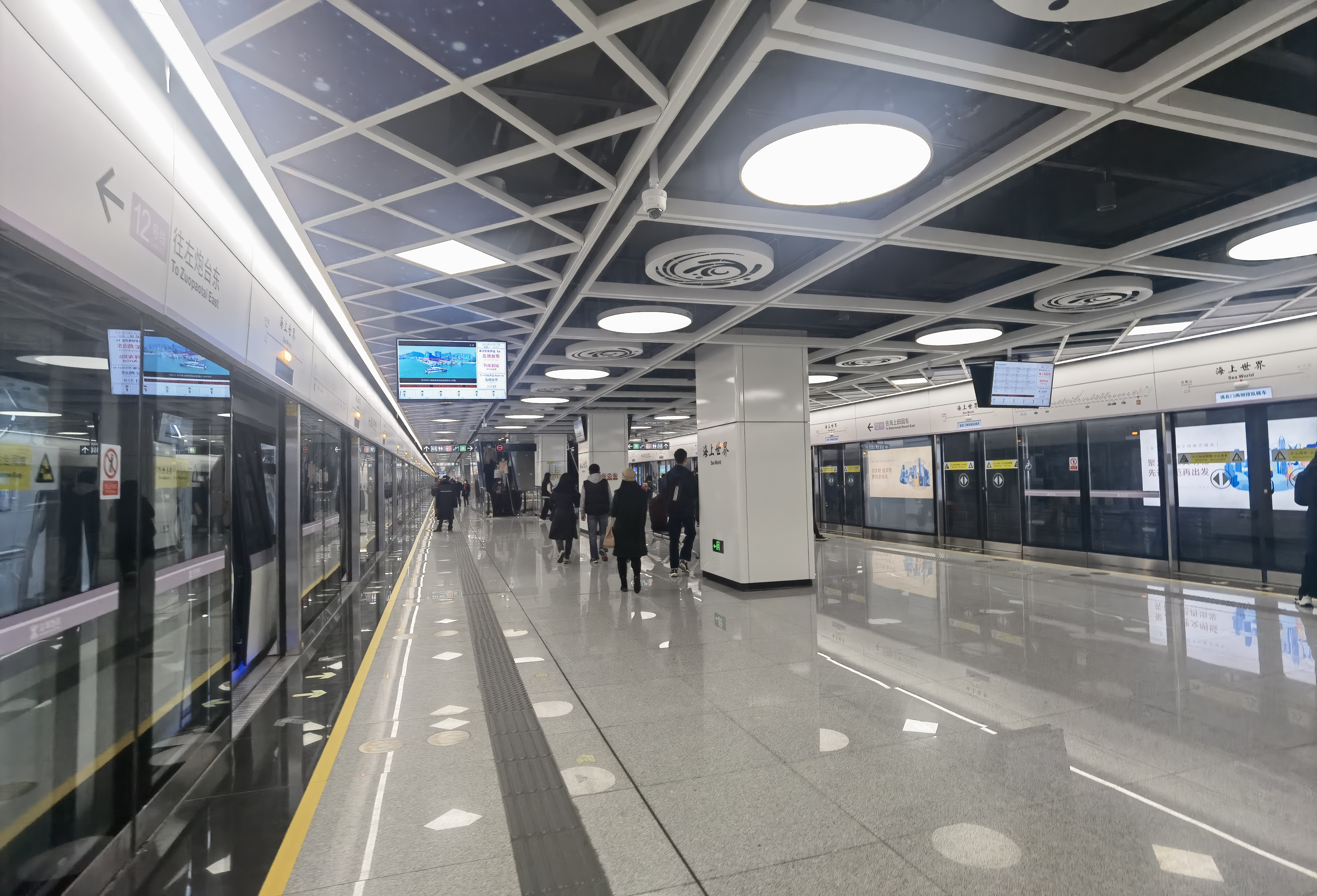
Line 12 platform
