= Shekou =

Neighborhood in Shenzhen, China

Coordinates: 22.486°N 113.911°E

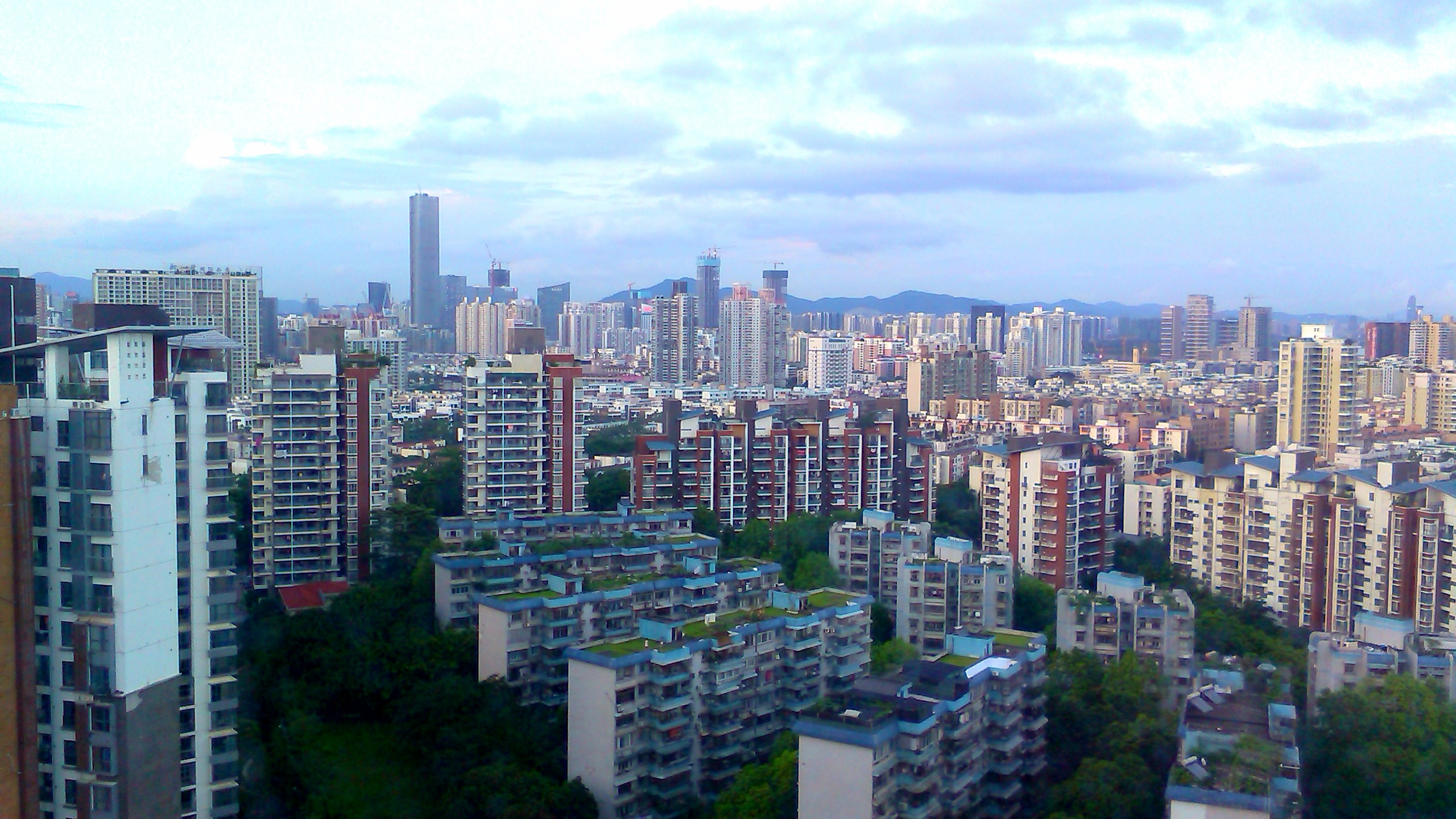
- Chinese: 蛇口
- Literal meaning: Snake's Mouth
Transcriptions
Standard Mandarin
- Hanyu Pinyin: Shékǒu
Yue: Cantonese
- Yale Romanization: Sèhháu
- Jyutping: Se4-hau2

Map showing Shenzhen and Hong Kong

Shekou (Chinese: 蛇口; pinyin: Shékǒu) is an area at the southern tip of Nanshan District, Shenzhen, Guangdong Province, China. It faces Yuen Long, Hong Kong, across the Shenzhen Bay. It has been designated as a free-trade zone by the government, alongside Qianhai, Hengqin and Nansha New Area.

== History ==
The area was formerly a customs station of Bao'an County. On 31 January 1979, it became officially known as the Shekou Industrial Zone, developed solely by China Merchants Group of Hong Kong under Yuan Geng's leadership, earlier than the formation of the Shenzhen Special Economic Zone. The event is chronicled in the Chinese ballad "The Story of Spring (春天的故事)". China Merchants Group helped developed Shekou into a modern port city through developing the industrial park, building a port which was highly accessible to the village, and building urban residences. China Merchants Group developed a reputation for this approach to development, which is called the Port-Park-City model or the Shekou model.

Since the 1980s, after foreign oil majors such as Agip, Chevron, Texaco, Statoil and Shell obtained concessions for oil exploration in the South China Sea, Shekou started serving as a base for a small contingent of foreign oil platform workers, since qualified personnel were not available locally. As a result of this first mover advantage in catering for mainly western tastes in housing, food and drink, entertainment and schooling, at a time when no alternatives were available in the area, Shekou gradually became home to the majority of the expatriate population working in and around Shenzhen and part of its hinterland in the Pearl River Delta. This trend has, however, abated after 2003, after the country's continued economic reforms. Development of other parts of the city and substantial increase in English levels of university graduates have made life in the city proper more acceptable to many foreigners without school-age children.

In 2003, the local government, seeking to capitalize on the foreign flavor of the area, invested in a complete make-over of Sea World, turning it into a western-style entertainment area centered on the grounded Minghua (明华) ship, a 14,000 ton, 168 m long vessel built in 1962 as a French ferry vessel purchased by China in 1973. It is commonly, though incorrectly, referred to by many locals as French president Charles de Gaulle's private yacht. Minghua is now completely landlocked due to extensive local land reclamation and redevelopment efforts.

Shekou is undergoing a major redevelopment project, costing an excess of 60 billion RMB. This included the construction of dozens of office and residential towers (such as the China Merchants Tower), a new cruise center replacing the old ferry terminal, a number of shopping malls around Sea World and the refurbishment of numerous older buildings.

== Transportation ==
Line 2 of the city's metro ends in Chiwan, an area just west of Shekou, therefore the line is also known as the Shekou line. Stations geographically located in Shekou include, among others Sea World and Shekou Port. Line 12 is a new line that goes to the east of Nanshan. It connects with the Shekou line at Sea World.

Shekou Cruise Center, which replaced the Shekou Port Ferry Terminal, offers regular ferry services to and from Hong Kong, Macau and Zhuhai. In regards to ferries from Hong Kong and Macau, the customs and immigration process is completed upon disembarking the ferry. Passengers taking ferries directly to Hong Kong International Airport can also check in for some flights at the terminal. Coming from Hong Kong International Airport, passengers can buy ferry tickets upon landing in Hong Kong, they do not need to go through customs in Hong Kong or collect their luggage. They can pick up their checked in luggage once arriving and going through customs in Shekou. The ferry runs throughout the day from 8:15 am to 9:50 pm. There are also buses travelling from the terminal to the Shenzhen Bao'an International Airport.

The Shekou container port is part of the large port complex of Shenzhen. Shekou port is one of the main fruit import cities in south China. The port is part of the 21st Century Maritime Silk Road that runs from the Chinese coast via the Suez Canal to the Mediterranean, there to the Upper Adriatic region to the hub of Trieste with its rail connections to Central and Eastern Europe.

== Community ==
The area attracts many tourists and has a sizable community of resident foreigners, and many non-Chinese restaurants exist in the area. According to the Shenzhen Management and Service Center for Expats, 6,275 of the 43,919 registered expats living in Shenzhen are registered with the Shekou Police Station and Shenzhenwan Police Station alone.

== Education ==
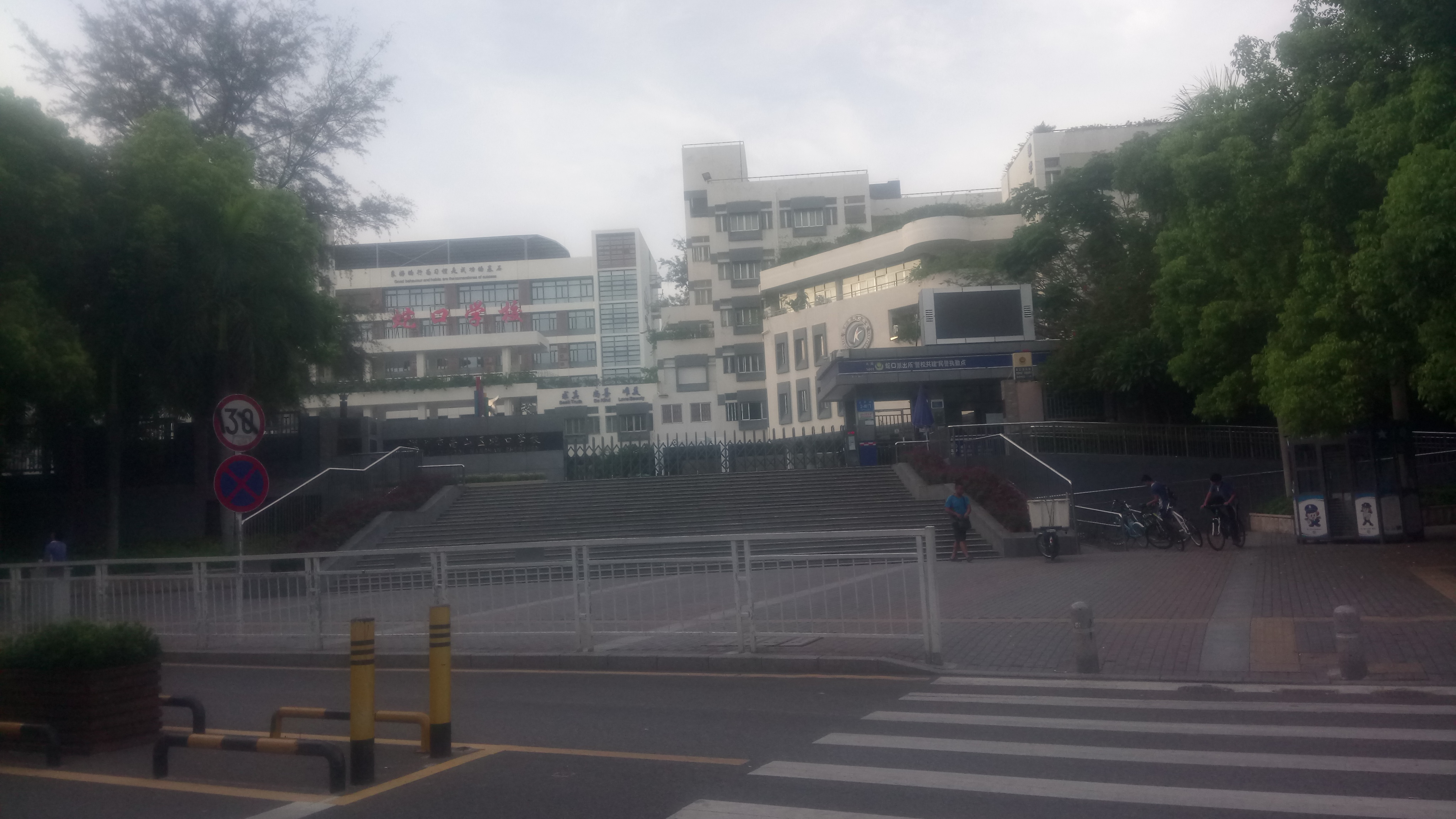
Shekou School (蛇口学校), which houses primary and secondary grades

Primary and secondary schools for local mainland Chinese students include:

- Shekou School, which houses primary and secondary grades
- Shenzhen Yucai Education Group, which includes one high school, two middle schools, four primary schools and 4 nursery schools

International primary and secondary schools in Shekou include:

- Shenzhen American International School
- Shenzhen Japanese School
- Korean International School in Shenzhen
- QSI International School of Shenzhen
- Shekou International School
- BASIS International School Shenzhen
- Recognize International Academy

Supplementary schools:

- Previously the Shenzhen Saturday School (深・(ｼﾝｾﾝ)補習授業校, formerly SHENZHEN日本人 補習校), a Japanese supplementary school, was based in the Ming Wah International Convention Centre (明华国际会议中心) in Shekou.

== Museums ==
- Sea World Culture and Arts Center (joint with the UK's Victoria and Albert Museum) opened on 2 December 2017
- Shenzhen Shekou Maritime Museum opened to the public on 29 June 2017

== Resource for foreigners ==
Shekou was chosen as the location for China's first Management and Service Center for Expats. The new facilities provide an information center for locals as well as a place where foreigners can get assistance from very friendly English-speaking staff. The types of assistance they offer include registration services for expats living in the area so foreigners no longer need to go to the police station, advice on marriage or disputes with landlords and employers, guidelines on leases, traveling, currency exchange and more.

== See also ==
- Shenzhen speed
- Yuan Geng
- Reform and opening up
