= Shekou Port station =

Metro station in Shenzhen, China

Shekou Port 蛇口港
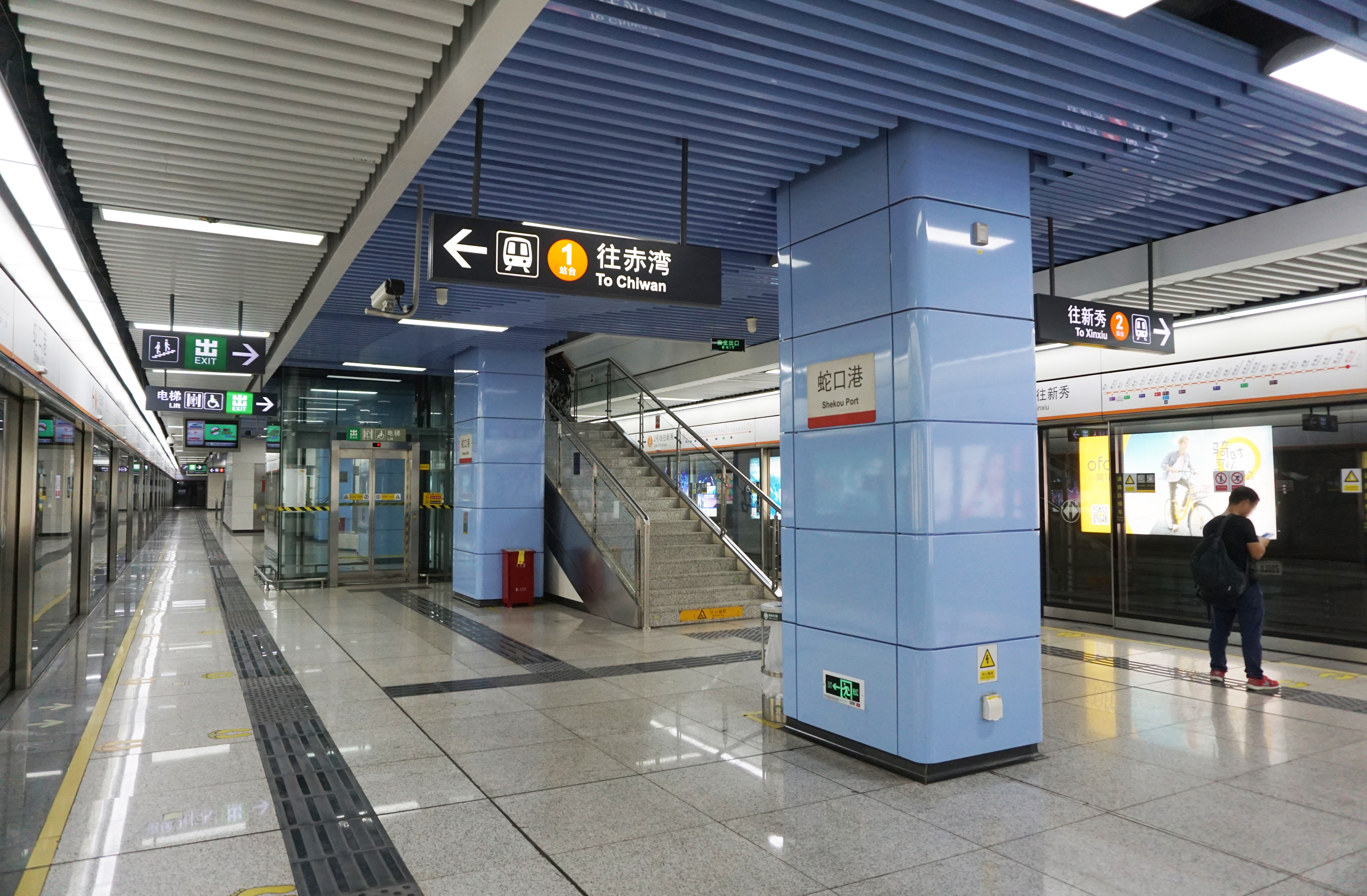

Chinese name
- Chinese: 蛇口港
- Literal meaning: Snake's Mouth Port
Transcriptions
Standard Mandarin
- Hanyu Pinyin: Shékǒu Gǎng
Yue: Cantonese
- Jyutping: Se4 Hau2 Gong2

General information
- Location: Nanshan District, Shenzhen, Guangdong; China
- Coordinates: 22°28′46″N 113°54′24″E
- Operator: SZMC (Shenzhen Metro Group)
- Line: Line 2
- Platforms: 2 (1 island platform)
- Tracks: 2

Construction
- Structure type: Underground
- Accessible: Yes

Other information
- Station code: 202

History
- Opened: 28 December 2010; 15 years ago

Services
Preceding station	Shenzhen Metro	Following station
Chiwan Terminus	Line 2	Sea World towards Liantang (Line 8: Xichong)
Route map
Location

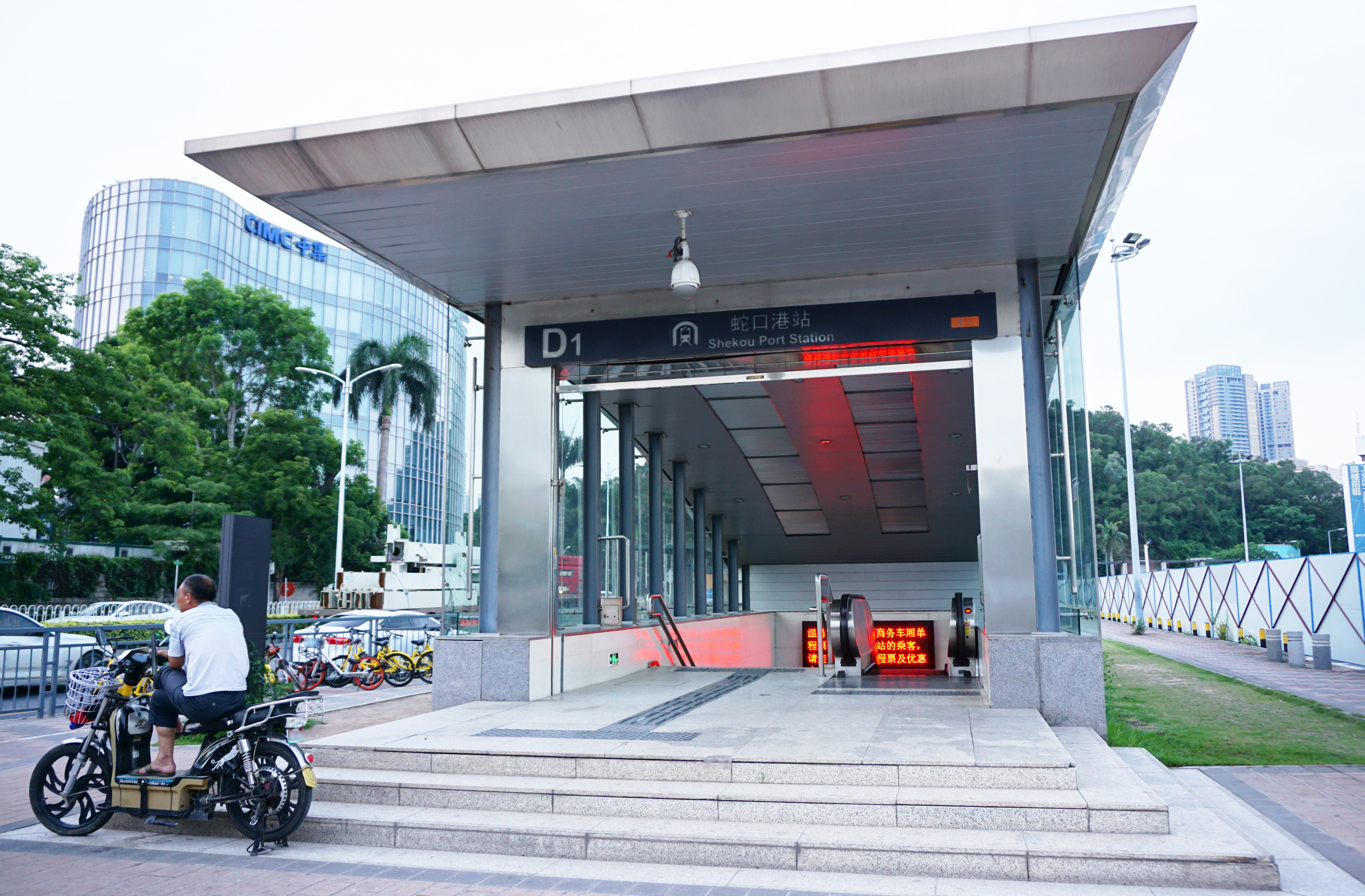
Exit D1

Shekou Port station (Chinese: 蛇口港站; pinyin: Shékǒu Gǎng Zhàn; Jyutping: Se4 Hau2 Gong2 Zaam6) is a metro station on Line 2 and Line 8 of the Shenzhen Metro. It was opened on 28 December 2010. This station helped serve the population travelling via the former Shekou Passenger Terminal, which is the origin of the station name. A shuttle bus runs from there (Exit C) to the new Shekou Cruise Center.

In early planning, this station was the southwestern terminus of Line 2.

== Station layout ==
G	-	Exit
B1F; Concourse	Lobby	Customer Service, Shops, Vending machines, ATMs
B2F; Platforms	Platform	← Line 2 towards Chiwan (Terminus)
B2F; Platforms	Island platform, doors will open on the left
B2F; Platforms	Platform	Line 8 towards Xichong (Sea World) →

== Exits ==
Exit	Destination
Exit C	Gangwan Road (E), Nanhai Boulevard, Shekou Ferry Terminal, Shekou Traffic Police Battalion, CIMC
Exit D	Gangwan Road (W)
