= Shekou Cruise Center =

Passenger ship terminal in Shenzhen, China

Coordinates: 22.468485°N 113.913648°E

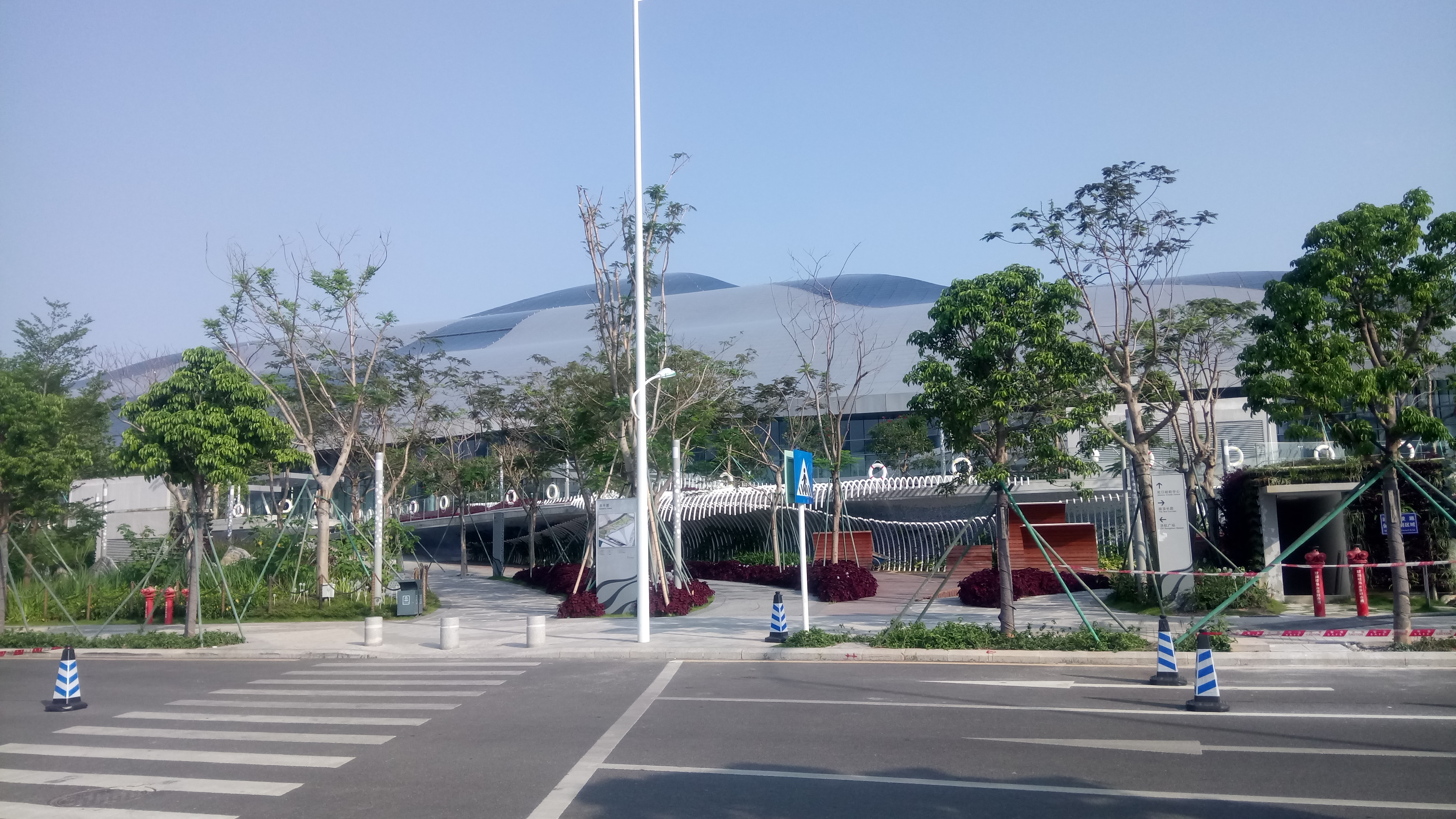
- Shekou Cruise Center
- Simplified Chinese: 蛇口邮轮中心
- Traditional Chinese: 蛇口郵輪中心
Transcriptions
Standard Mandarin
- Hanyu Pinyin: Shékǒu Yóulún Zhōngxīn
Yue: Cantonese
- Jyutping: se^{4} hau^{2} jau^{4} leon^{4} zung^{1} sam^{1}

Shenzhen Ferry Terminal
- Simplified Chinese: 蛇口客运码头
- Traditional Chinese: 蛇口客運碼頭
Transcriptions
Standard Mandarin
- Hanyu Pinyin: Shékǒu Kèyùn Mǎtóu
Yue: Cantonese
- Jyutping: se^{4} hau^{2} haak^{3} wan^{6} maa^{5} tau^{4}

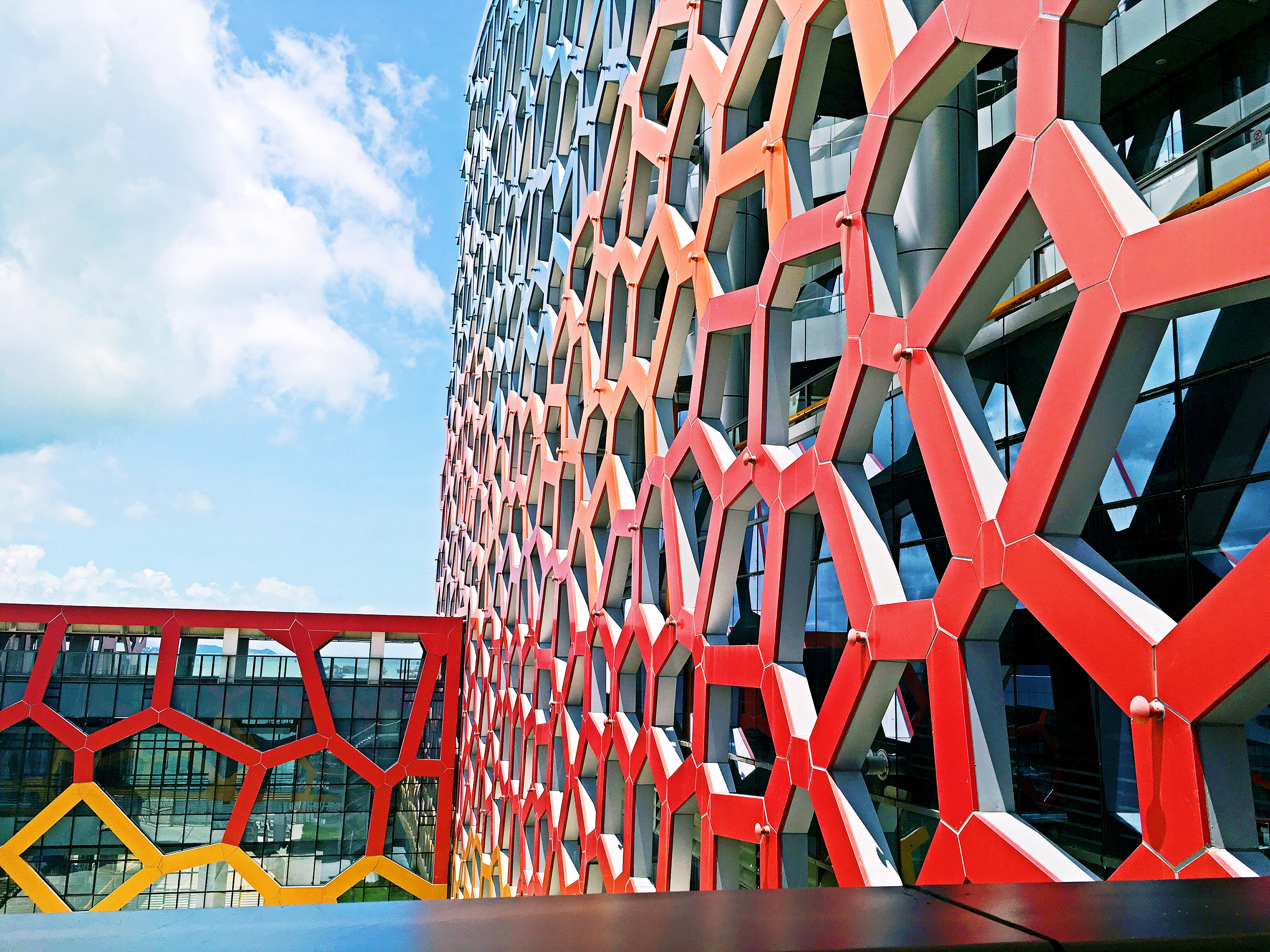
Shekou Cruise Center

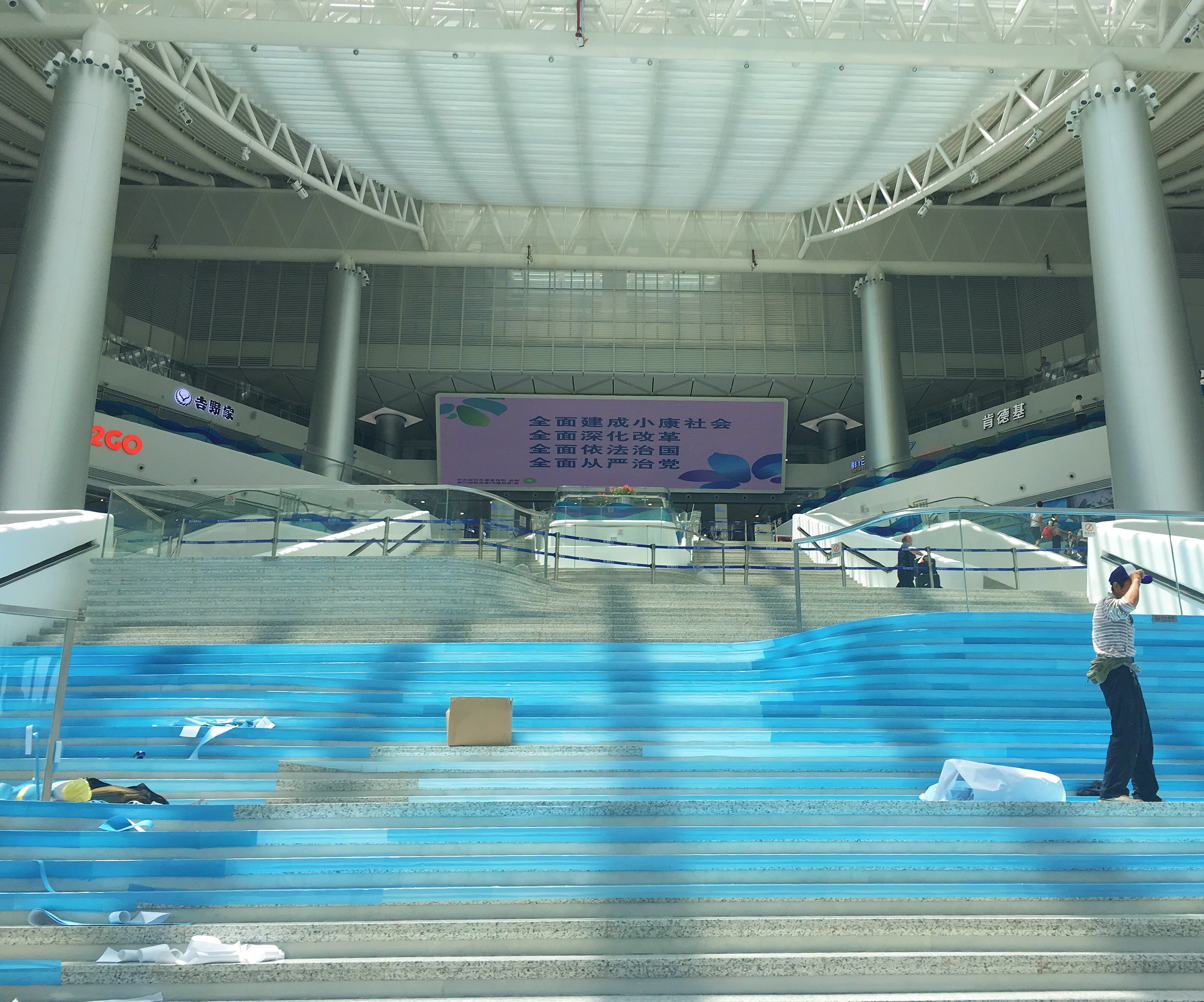
Main Hall of the Cruise Center

Shekou Cruise Center (Chinese: 蛇口邮轮中心), also known as the Shekou Ferry Terminal (蛇口客运码头) and the Shekou Prince Bay Cruise Homeport, is a cruise terminal located in Shekou, Nanshan District, Shenzhen, China. It runs direct ferry connections from Shenzhen to destinations across the Pearl River Delta. It is operated by China Merchants Shekou Ferry Terminal Service Co., Ltd. Ferry operations are operated by Xunlong Ferries, TurboJET and CKS Ferries. It can also handle cruise ships docking and replenishment, and is the first cruise terminal in China. This facility replaces the former Shekou Passenger Terminal and is part of a larger urban renewal and redevelopment along Shenzhen Bay.

== History ==
It was announced by the operating company, in December 2013, that a major redevelopment will take place. Construction started in 2014. The first cruise ship, the SuperStar Virgo of Star Cruises tied alongside, on Friday afternoon October 14, 2016, ahead of the terminal's opening party. The new Shenzhen Prince Bay Cruise Homeport will open on November 1, 2016. It is located 1.5 kilometres (4,900 ft) south-west of the former ferry terminal with a free shuttle bus connecting the new terminal with the Shekou Port Metro Station.

== Structure ==
The triangular shaped terminal building designed by the French architect Denis Laming allows for a much larger space than the former ferry terminal. It features 12 ferries berths and 2 cruise ship berths.

== Destinations ==
There are 30 ships operating from the terminal, of which 22 are high speed luxury ferries, and 8 are ordinary high speed ferries. These service five scheduled high speed passenger ship lines (namely Shekou to Hong Kong International Airport, Hong Kong, Macau Peninsula, Macau's Taipa Island and Zhuhai) and nonscheduled charter services to Pearl River Delta islands.

Destination; English (Chinese)	Terminal Name; English (Chinese)	Service Schedule; From Shekou (To Shekou)	Distance; Nautical Miles (Duration)
Hong Kong	Hong Kong–Macau Ferry Terminal (港澳碼頭)	0745-1915 (0900-2030)	25Nm (50min)
Hong Kong International Airport	Skypier (海天客運碼頭)	0745-2100 (0900-2145)	11Nm (30min)
Macau	Outer Harbour Ferry Terminal (外港客運碼頭)	0815-1930 (0945-2045)	25Nm (1 hour)
Macau	Taipa Ferry Terminal	0930-1900 (1100-2030)	32Nm (70min)
Zhuhai	Zhuhai Jiuzhou Ferry Terminal	0730-2130 (0800-2130)	25Nm (1 hour)

Pre-check in service is available for certain flights departing from Hong Kong International Airport, so at Shekou Terminal, passengers can directly get the boarding pass and baggage delivery service for flights taking off from Hong Kong International Airport. Participating airlines are as follows for check-in services:

- All Nippon Airways (NH)
- Cathay Pacific (CX)
- China Airlines (CI)
- EVA Airways (BR)
- Garuda Indonesia (GA)
- Hong Kong Airlines (HX)
- Hong Kong Express Airways (UO)
- Japan Airlines (JL)
- Mandarin Airlines (AE)
- Singapore Airlines (SQ)
- Turkish Airlines (TK)
- United Airlines (UA)

Cathay Pacific has a 'Shekou Cruise Home Port' lounge which is available to the eligible travellers ahead of their journey to HKIA to board a connecting flight.

== Ground transportation ==
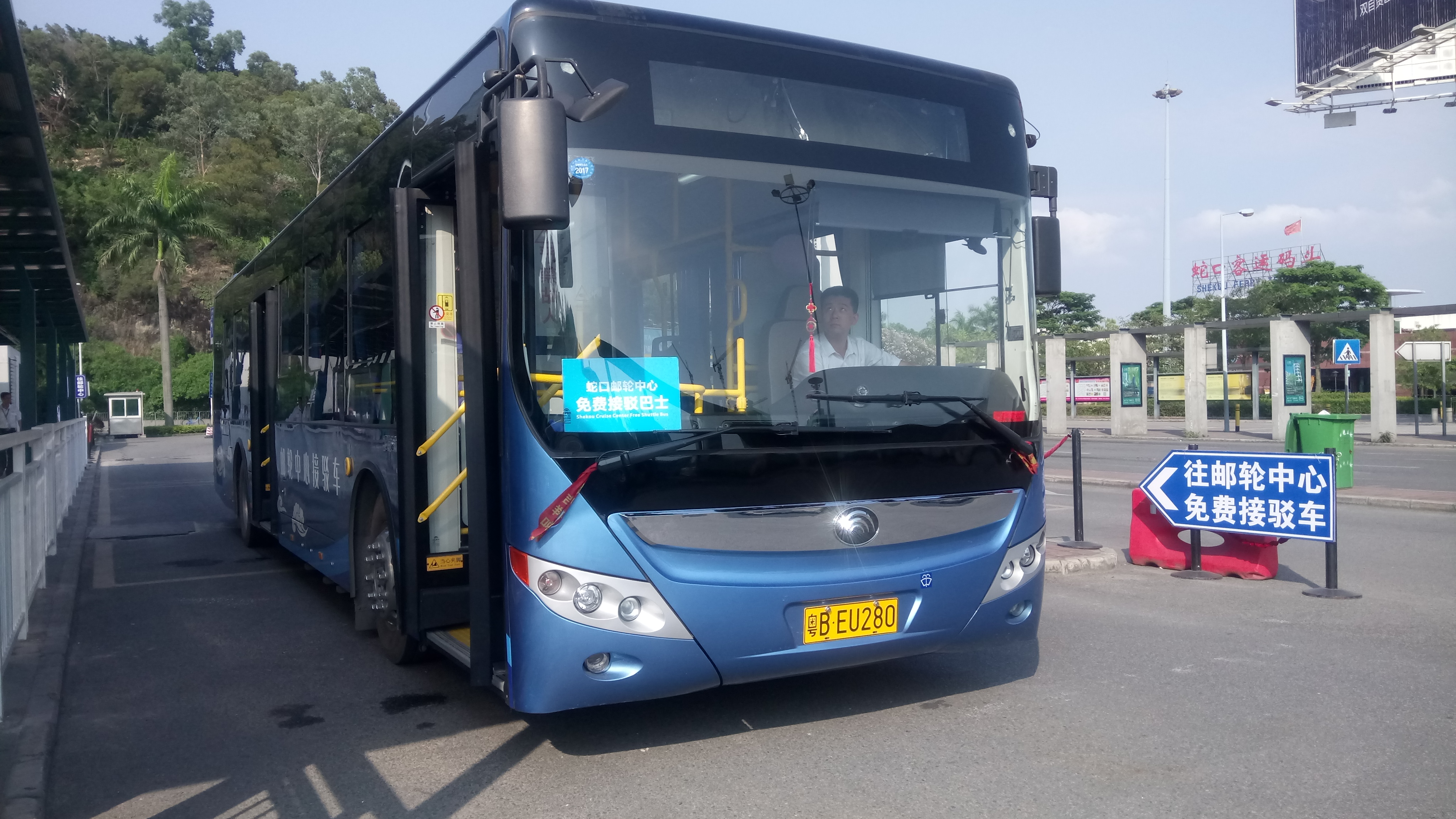
Shekou Cruise Center Free Shuttle Bus at the site of the former Shekou Ferry Terminal

The closest metro station is Taiziwan. Taxis are available in the parking area. A free shuttle bus service links with the old Shekou Ferry Terminal, near exit C of the Shekou Port metro station. A bus depot is located near the station offering services across the city.
