= Shekou Ferry Terminal (1981–2016) =

Former ferry terminal in Shenzhen, China

- Simplified Chinese: 蛇口客运码头
- Traditional Chinese: 蛇口客運碼頭
Transcriptions
Standard Mandarin
- Hanyu Pinyin: Shékǒu Kèyùn Mǎtóu
Yue: Cantonese
- Jyutping: se^{4} hau^{2} haak^{3} wan^{6} maa^{5} tau^{4}

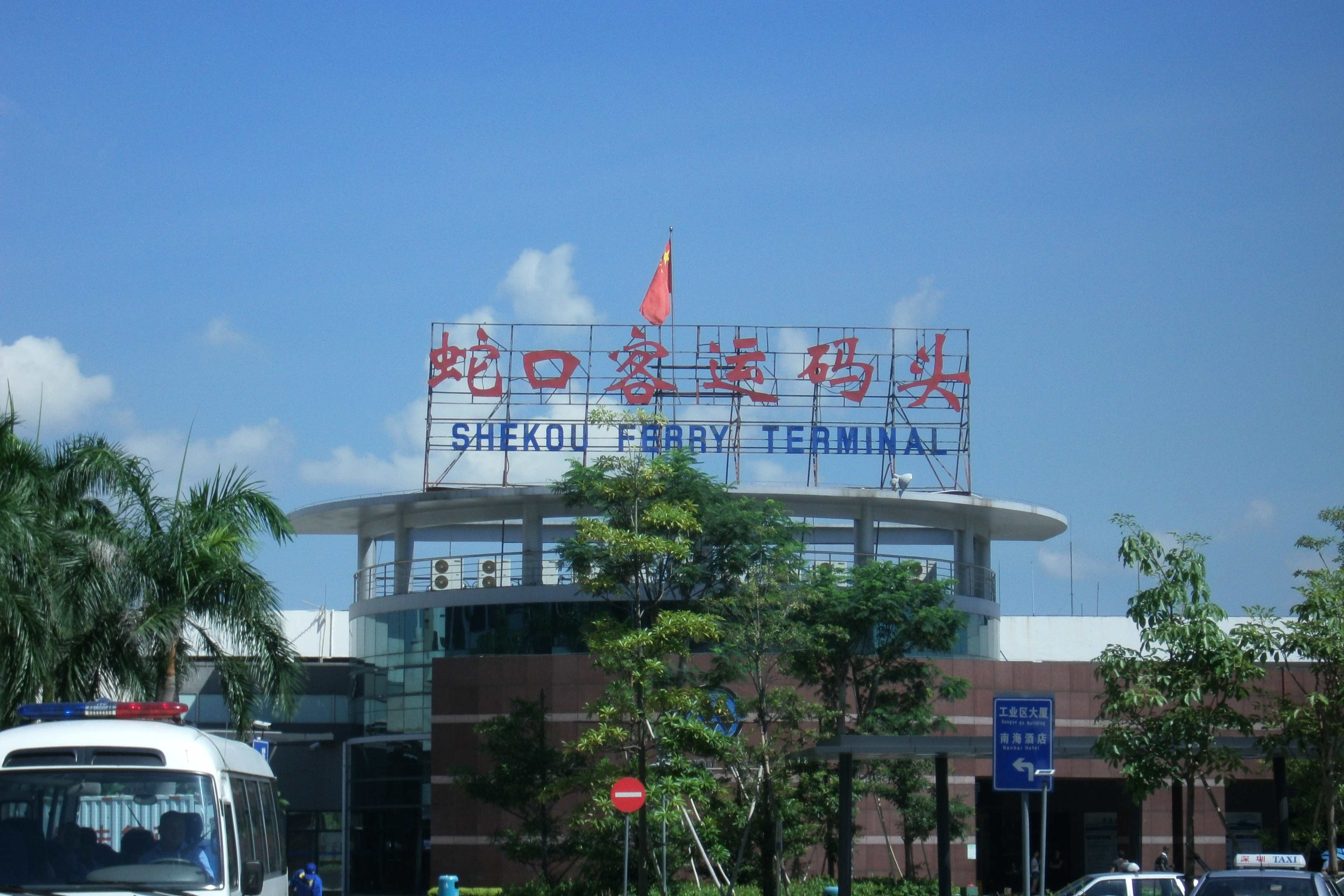
Shekou Ferry Terminal

Shekou Ferry Terminal (Chinese: 蛇口客运码头) was a ferry port located in Shekou, Nanshan District, Shenzhen, China. It allowed for direct ferry connections from Shenzhen to destinations across the Pearl River Delta. It was operated by China Merchant Shekou Ferry Terminal Service Co., Ltd. It was also known as Shekou Port Ferry Terminal. It was the waterway passenger transportation junction of Shenzhen. Ferry operations were operated by TurboJET and CKS Ferries.

It was replaced by the Shekou Cruise Center, also known as the new Shekou Ferry Terminal.

== Structure ==
The terminal was built in 1981, and the coastline of the terminal was 1,025m long, there were 16 berths, and covered an area of 25,371m^{2}. It had two ticket halls, three waiting halls (two for HK-Macau line, and one for domestic line) and six service counters for pre-check-in.

== Destinations ==
In 2013, there were 30 ships operating from the terminal, of which 22 are high speed luxury ferries, and 8 were ordinary high speed ferries. These service five scheduled high speed passenger ship lines (namely Shekou to Hong Kong International Airport, Hong Kong, Macau Peninsula, Macau's Taipa Island and Zhuhai) and nonscheduled charter services to Pearl River Delta islands.

Destination English (Chinese)	Terminal name English (Chinese)	Service schedule from Shekou (to Shekou)	Distance nautical miles (duration)
Hong Kong	Hong Kong–Macau Ferry Terminal (港澳碼頭)	0745–1915 (0900–2030)	25Nm (50min)
Hong Kong International Airport	Skypier (海天客運碼頭)	0745–2100 (0900–2145)	11Nm (30min)
Macau	Outer Harbour Ferry Terminal (外港客運碼頭)	0815–1930 (0945–2045)	25Nm (1 hour)
Macau	Taipa Temporary Ferry Terminal	0930–1900 (1100–2030)	32Nm (70min)
Zhuhai	Zhuhai Jiuzhou Ferry Terminal	0730–2130 (0800–2130)	25Nm (1 hour)

Pre-check-in service was available for certain flights departing from Hong Kong International Airport, so at Shekou Terminal, passengers could directly get the boarding pass and baggage delivery service for flights taking off from Hong Kong International Airport. Participating airlines are as follows for check-in services:

- All Nippon Airways (NH)
- Cathay Pacific Airways (CX)
- China Airlines (CI)
- EVA Airways (BR)
- Garuda Indonesia (GA)
- Hong Kong Airlines (HX)
- Hong Kong Express Airways (UO)
- Japan Airlines (JL)
- Mandarin Airlines (AE)
- Singapore Airlines (SQ)
- Turkish Airlines (TK)
- United Airlines (UA)

== Ground transportation ==
From the ferry terminal building itself, taxis were available close to the door. A connecting bus depot offered local services across Nanshan but with some services across to Futian and Luohu districts of the city terminating at Shenzhen railway station. Airport Express Line 10 offers quick transfer to Shenzhen Bao'an International Airport. Metro rail services are available beyond the bus depot at the underground Shekou Port station on the Shekou Line.

== Closure ==
Since its original construction, there had been very limited modifications and renovations to the terminal building. It was announced by the operating company, in December 2013, that a major redevelopment would take place. Construction started in 2014, and it was expected to take 3 years to complete. The ferry services and facilities were to be greatly expanded and allow for cruise ships to dock at the same facility. The new Shekou Cruise Center opened on November 1, 2016. It is located 1.5 km south-west of the old ferry terminal with a free shuttle bus connecting the new terminal with the Shekou Port Metro Station. The ferry terminal was closed and demolished as part of further urban renewal and redevelopment works.
