= Yuan Geng =

Chinese guerilla fighter and policy entrepreneur

- 袁庚
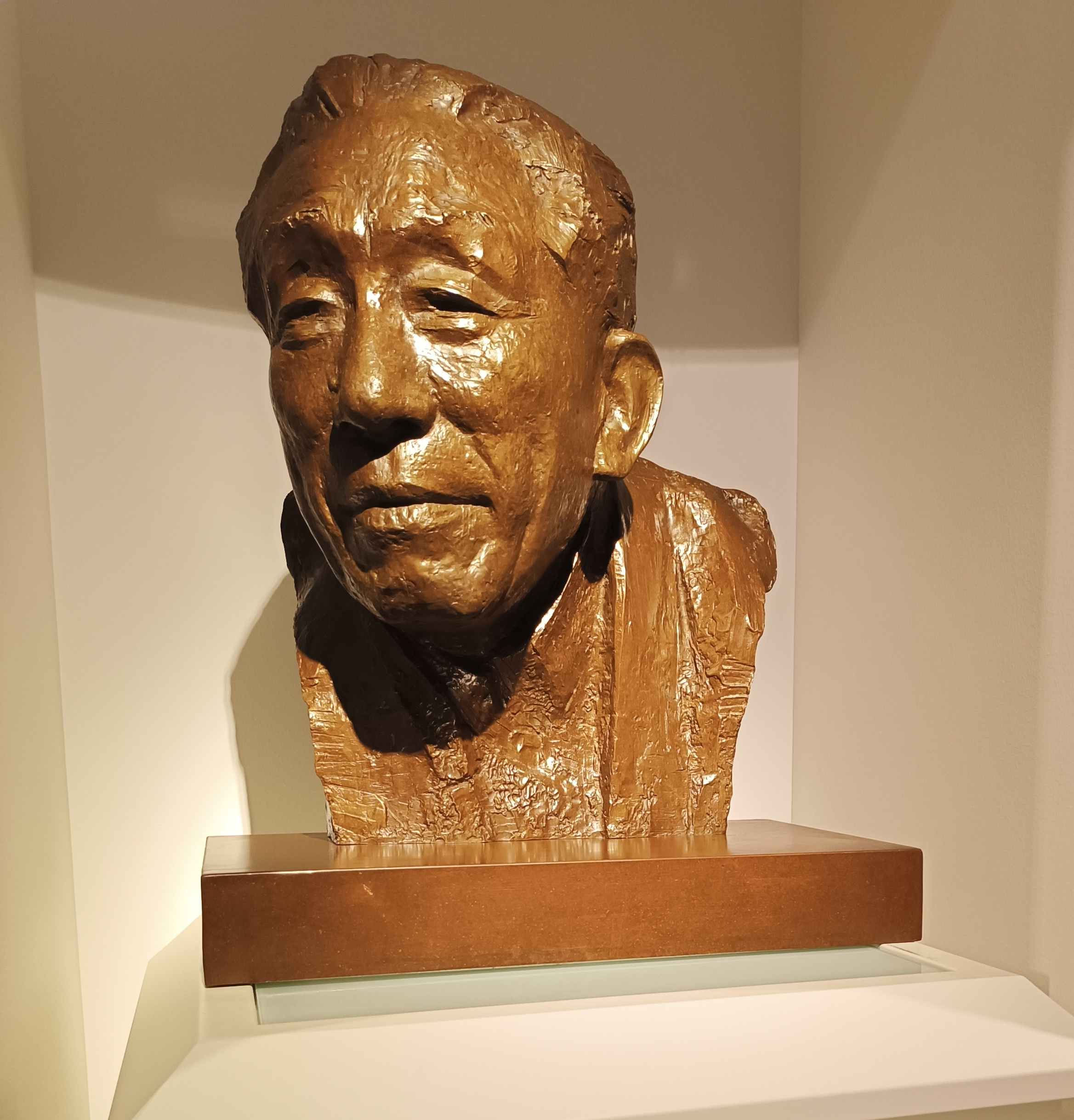
- Bust of Yuan Geng
- Born: Ouyang Rushan (欧阳汝山); 23 April 1917; Dapeng, Bao'an County, Guangdong, China
- Died: 31 January 2016 (aged 98); Shekou, Shenzhen, China
- Known for: Establishment of Shekou Industrial Zone, founding of China Merchants Bank and Ping An Insurance
- Awards: Golden Bauhinia Star

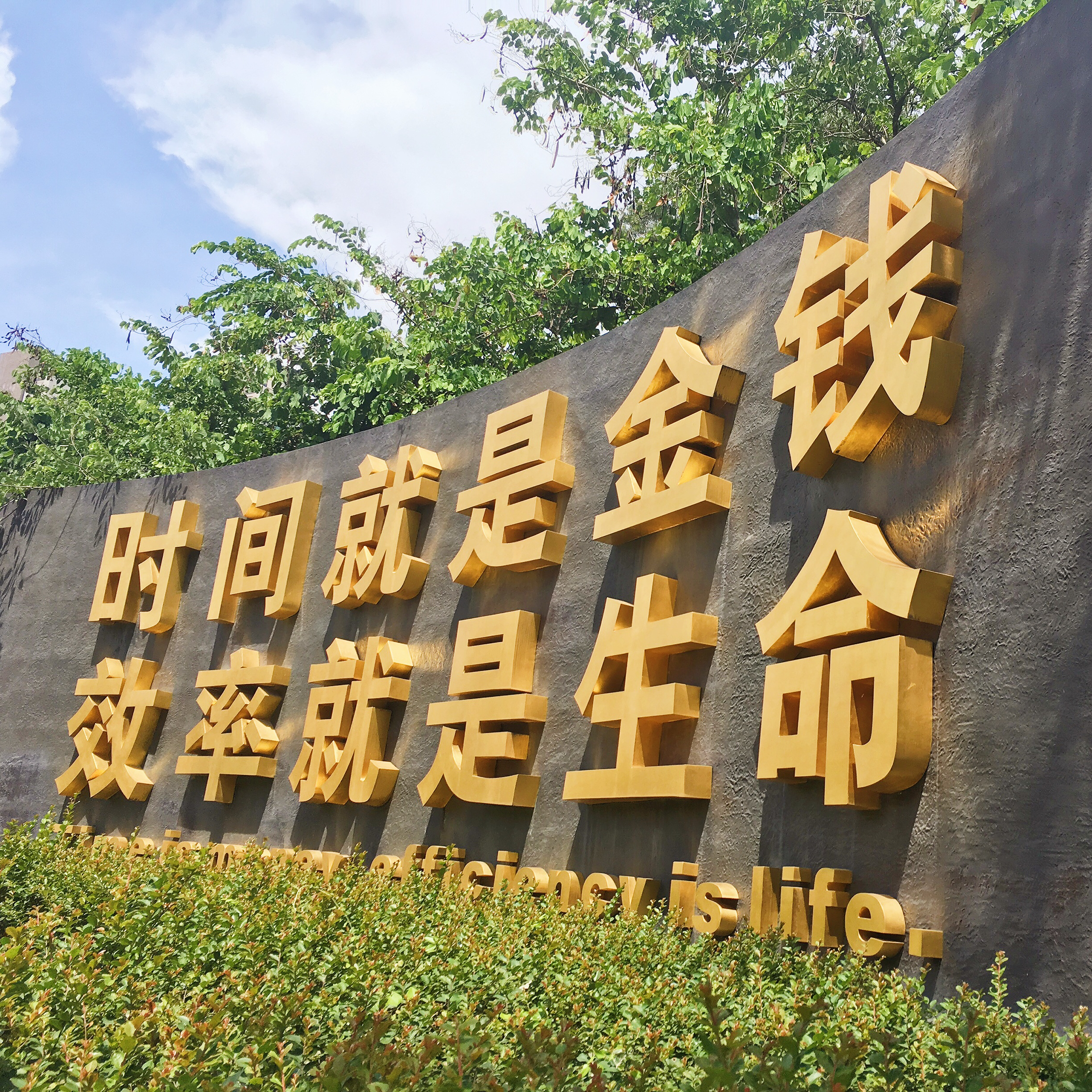
'Time is money, Efficiency is life', one of Yuan Geng's most famous quotes

Yuan Geng (Chinese: 袁庚; 23 April 1917 – 31 January 2016), born Ouyang Rushan, was a Chinese guerrilla fighter, war hero, spy, policy visionary, and serial entrepreneur on behalf of the Chinese state. He was an early proponent of China's reform and opening up, and went on to create Shekou Industrial Zone, China International Marine Containers, CSG Holding, China Merchants Bank, and Ping An Insurance.

== Early life and career ==
Born in Bao'an County, now part of Shenzhen, he joined the Chinese Communist Party at age 21 and fought guerrilla operations against the Japanese occupation army in the Dongjiang (East River) Column of the CPC-led Guangdong People's Anti-Japanese Aggression Guerrilla Force from March 1939. In 1942 he led a noted rescue operation of 800 people, and in 1944 became head of the Dongjiang Column's liaison division. In this capacity he provided crucial information to the US military (Pacific Fleet and 14th Army Air Force) about Japanese operations in Guangdong.

In September 1945, he created a liaison office for the Communist guerrillas in Hong Kong, which later became the Xinhua News Agency office and as such, the de facto embassy of the People's Republic of China in the territory after 1949. From 1945 to 1949 he went on to fight the Chinese Civil War as an artillery officer.

From November 1949, Yuan Geng pursued a career as an intelligence officer, seconded to Ho Chi Minh in Vietnam in 1950, then as Consul in Jakarta from 1952. In 1955, he was in charge of security for the Chinese delegation at the Bandung Conference, and was credited with saving Premier Zhou Enlai from the KMT-led assassination plot that resulted in the airplane crash of the Kashmir Princess. He was imprisoned in April 1968 during the Cultural Revolution, in Beijing's Qincheng Prison.

In October 1975, he was rehabilitated and appointed Deputy Director of the Bureau of Foreign Affairs in the Ministry of Communications (or Transport).

== Father of Shekou ==
Transport Minister Ye Fei asked Yuan Geng to direct his attention to the China Merchants Steam Navigation Company in Hong Kong, a Qing dynasty-era commercial enterprise which the PRC government had taken over in 1949 and kept in operation. Based on his in-depth knowledge of Hong Kong, Yuan Geng became convinced of the immense potential for market-led economic development on the mainland. His report on how to make better use of China Merchants was forwarded by the Transports Ministry to the State Council on 9 October 1978, recommending opening up the mainland economy to the international market using China Merchants as an instrument. This proposal was approved after three days.

The policy context became even more favorable following the Third Plenum meeting of December 1978, which cemented the political leadership of Deng Xiaoping and the policy direction of reform and opening up. Losing no time, in early January 1979 Yuan Geng prepared a pilot project in the form of an industrial zone supported by China Merchants, initially focused on ship breaking, with exemptions from the mainland's constraints on economic activity. Yuan Geng chose to start with a geographically limited area as the Shekou Industrial Park (SIP), which later became the Shekou Industrial Zone. The project was supported by Transport Minister Ye Fei and Guangdong Revolutionary Commission chairman Zheng Sheng. It was swiftly approved in a meeting on 31 January 1979 in Zhongnanhai attended by Party Vice Chairman Li Xiannian, Vice Premier Gu Mu, Vice Minister of Communications Peng Deqing, and Yuan Geng. Li Xiannian circled the Nantou Peninsula, on which Shekou is located, on Yuan Geng's map of the Hong Kong area, to mark approval of the project and extension of its perimeter. Following this episode, the project was nicknamed "circled SIP."

The Shekou Industrial Park then became the template for Deng Xiaoping's subsequent policy to establish China's special economic zones (SEZs), which took shape in April 1979 on proposals by Guangdong officials led by Xi Zhongxun. In Guangdong, the policy was actively pursued by Xi Zhongxun's successor Ren Zhongyi, who worked closely with Yuan Geng.

Throughout the 1980s, Yuan Geng pioneered policies that were unprecedented in post-1949 China, such as merit-based recruitment, promotion and pay, open access to housing, competitive procurement bids, local elections, local press freedom, and attracting foreign direct investors. The approach he developed for access to housing, freed from individual dependence on work unit, has been credited as a key enabler of the Pearl River Delta's success. In 1985 he organized local elections in the Shekou Industrial Park, in which 2,000 residents and workers participated. The microclimate of freedom Yuan Geng fostered in Shekou was illustrated by the incident known as "Shekou tempest" in 1988.

In 1981 Yuan Geng coined the slogan "time is gold and efficiency is life." It was endorsed by Deng Xiaoping during his visit of Shenzhen in January 1984 and subsequently approved as Shekou's slogan on 24 February 1984. Yuan's slogan was inscribed on a giant billboard in Shekou and became a motto of the reform era.

== Later ventures ==
Yuan Geng went on to create a number of state-owned enterprises which participated greatly in the prosperity of the Pearl River Delta, most of them directly to support economic activity in Shekou. In January 1980, he established China International Marine Containers.

In July 1982 he created China Nanshan Development (Group) Incorporation, China's first Sino-foreign joint-stock joint venture, for the development of an oil terminal.

He followed up with the creation of Shenzhen Chiwan Wharf Holdings Limited, now known as Chiwan Base, as a joint-venture with Singaporean partners.

In 1984 he created China Southern Glass Holding Limited, now China's largest architectural glass manufacturer.

In 1987 he created China Merchants Bank, the first joint-stock commercial bank on China's mainland, with support from the People's Bank of China Governor Chen Muhua.

In May 1988, he steered the creation of Ping An, the first joint-stock insurance company in mainland China, initially with support from China Merchants Bank.

== Death and legacy ==
Yuan Geng retired in 1992. He was never very senior in the party hierarchy, did not amass personal wealth, and was highly respected for his integrity, loyalty and humility. He died on 31 January 2016, in Shenzhen.

The local and national press immediately paid tribute, celebrating him as a significant protagonist of China's reform and opening up. On the night of his death, an official memorial ceremony was led by Shenzhen Party Secretary Ma Xingrui and Mayor Xu Qin at the Shekou China Merchants Museum. Simultaneously, a spontaneous celebration was held at the Shekou Community Trust, echoing other cases of unprovoked manifestation of popular support following the death of respected Chinese officials.

Pony Ma, founder of Shenzhen-based Tencent, has described Yuan Geng as "the embodiment of the Shenzhen spirit."

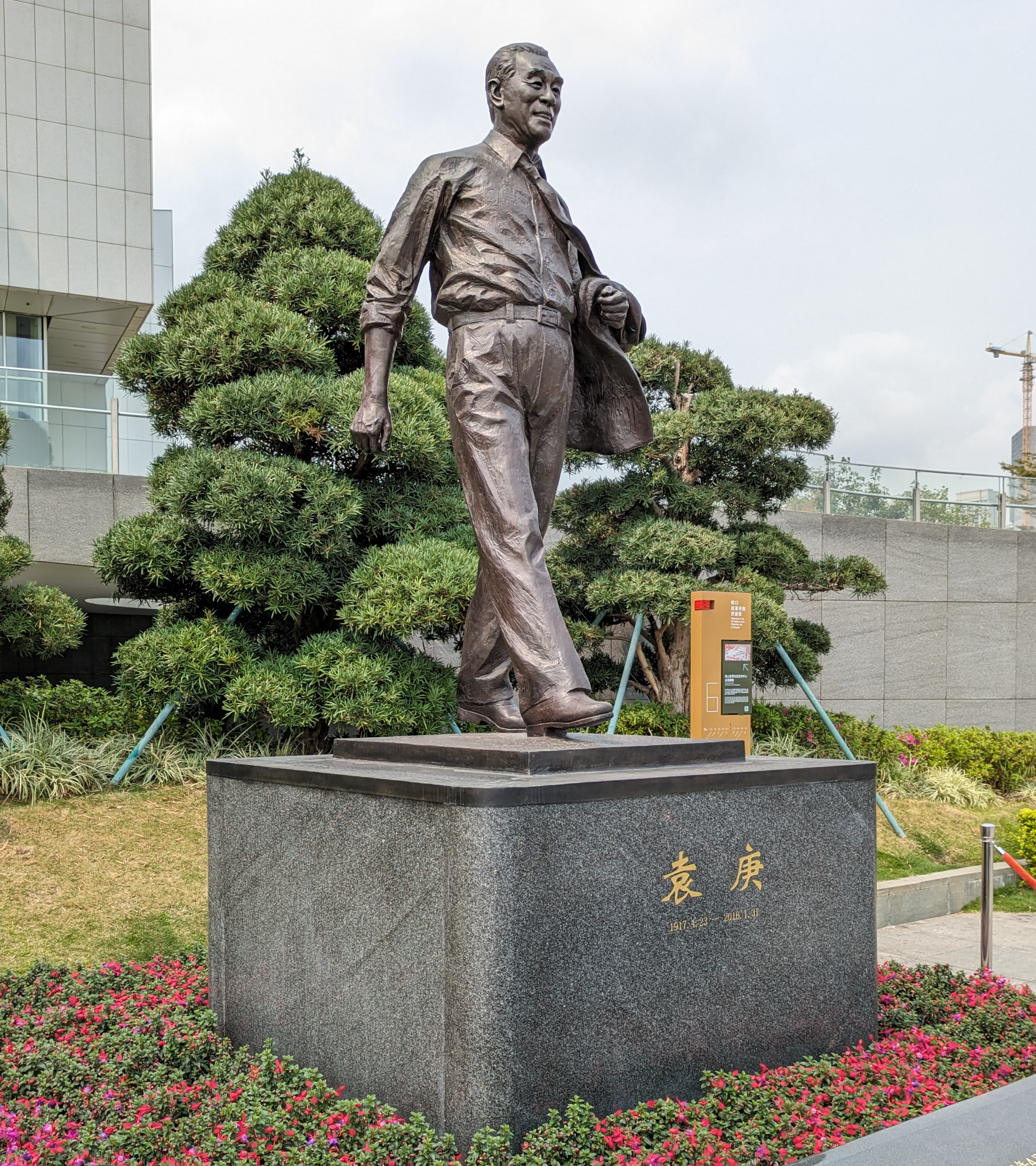
Statue of Yuan Geng at Sea World

A statue of Yuan Geng by local sculptor Lu Zengkang, sponsored by China Merchants Group, was inaugurated in Shekou's Sea World downtown development on 23 April 2017, his 100th birthday. As of 2018 the statue stands in front of Sea World Culture and Arts Center, in which the third floor hosts a display celebrating the history of Shekou and Yuan Geng's legacy. Another sculpture, a larger-than-lifesize bust of Yuan Geng by sculptor Yìshùjiā Wèizhī, was erected in 2017 in Shenzhen Talent Park, near Shenzhen Bay Park and close to the Shenzhen Bay Super Headquarters Base business district.

== See also ==
- Reform and opening up
- Wu Tingju
- Shenzhen speed
