= Huaguoshan station =

Shenzhen Metro Line 12 station

Huaguoshan 花果山
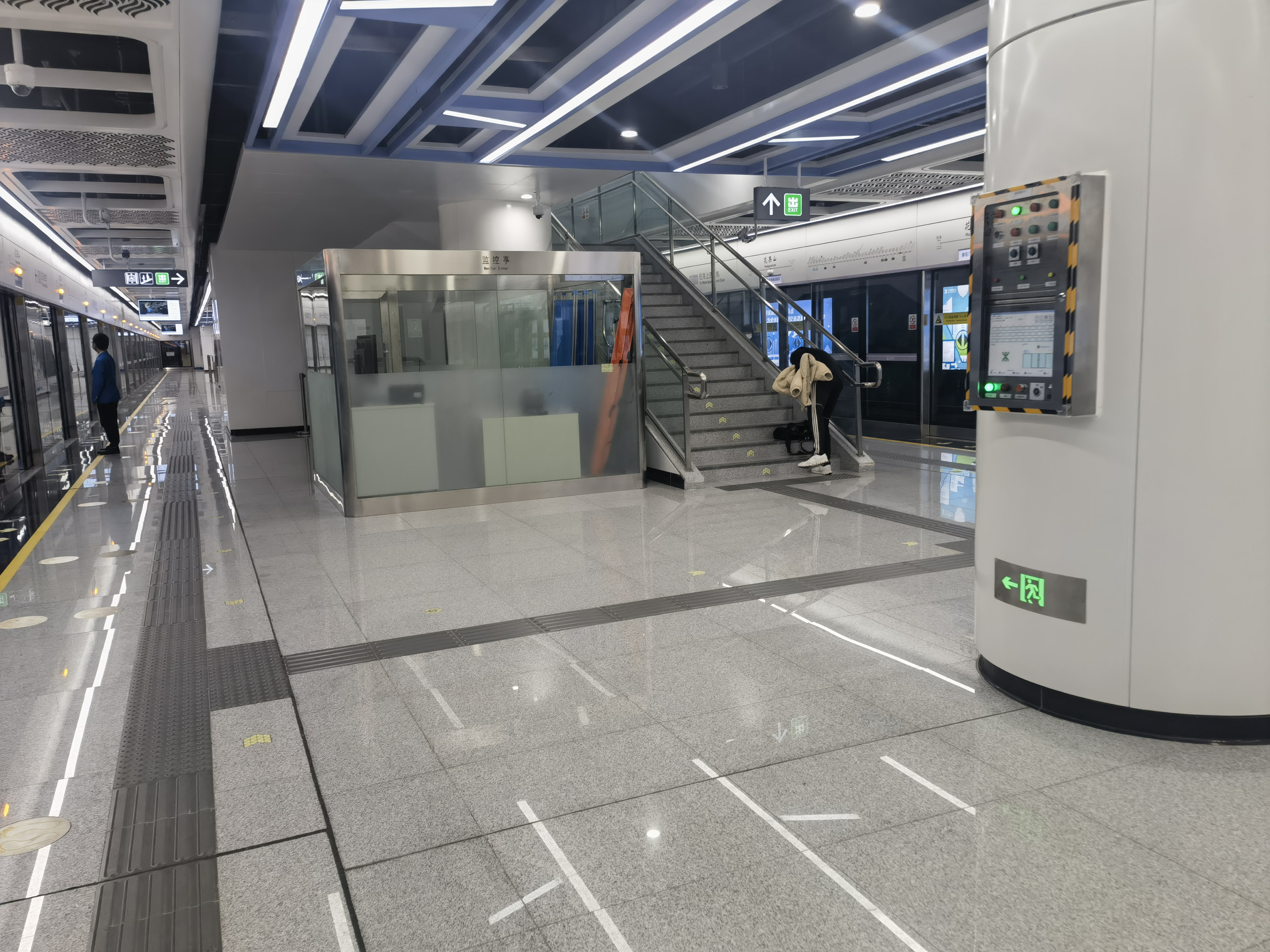
- Platforms of Huaguoshan station

Chinese name
- Chinese: 花果山
Transcriptions
Standard Mandarin
- Hanyu Pinyin: Huāguǒ Shān
Yue: Cantonese
- Yale Romanization: Fāgwo Sāan
- Jyutping: Faa1 Gwo2 Saan1

General information
- Location: North of the intersection of Gongye 6th Road and Nanhai Boulevard; Zhaoshang Subdistrict, Nanshan District, Shenzhen, Guangdong; China
- Coordinates: 22°29′50.24″N 113°54′50.80″E
- Operated by: Shenzhen Line 12 Rail Transit Co., Ltd (Shenzhen Metro Group and PowerChina PPP)
- Line: Line 12
- Platforms: 2 (1 island platform)
- Tracks: 2

Construction
- Structure type: Underground
- Accessible: Yes

History
- Opened: 28 November 2022 (3 years ago)

Services
Preceding station	Shenzhen Metro	Following station
Sihai towards Songgang	Line 12	Sea World towards Zuopaotai East
Location

Huaguoshan station (Chinese: 花果山站; pinyin: Huāguǒ Shān Zhàn; Cantonese Yale: Fāgwo Sāan Jaahm) is a metro station on Line 12 of Shenzhen Metro. It was opened on 28 November 2022.

== Station layout ==
The station has an island platform under Nanhai Road.

G	–	Exit
B1F; Concourse	Lobby	Ticket Machines, Customer Service, Station Control Room
B2F; Platforms	Platform	12 towards Songgang (Sihai)
B2F; Platforms	Island platform, doors will open on the left
B2F; Platforms	Platform	12 towards Zuopaotai East (Sea World)

=== Entrances/exits ===
The station has 4 points of entry/exit, with Exit A being accessible via elevator.

Exit	Destination
Exit A	Nanhai Boulevard, Huaxia Building, Yucai High School, Nanbo Technological Building
Exit B	Xinghua Industrial Building, Shekou Fire Station
Exit C1	Wanggu Technological Building, Korean International School in Shenzhen, Shekou Technological Building
Exit C2	TCL Technology Building, Shekou Wanggu

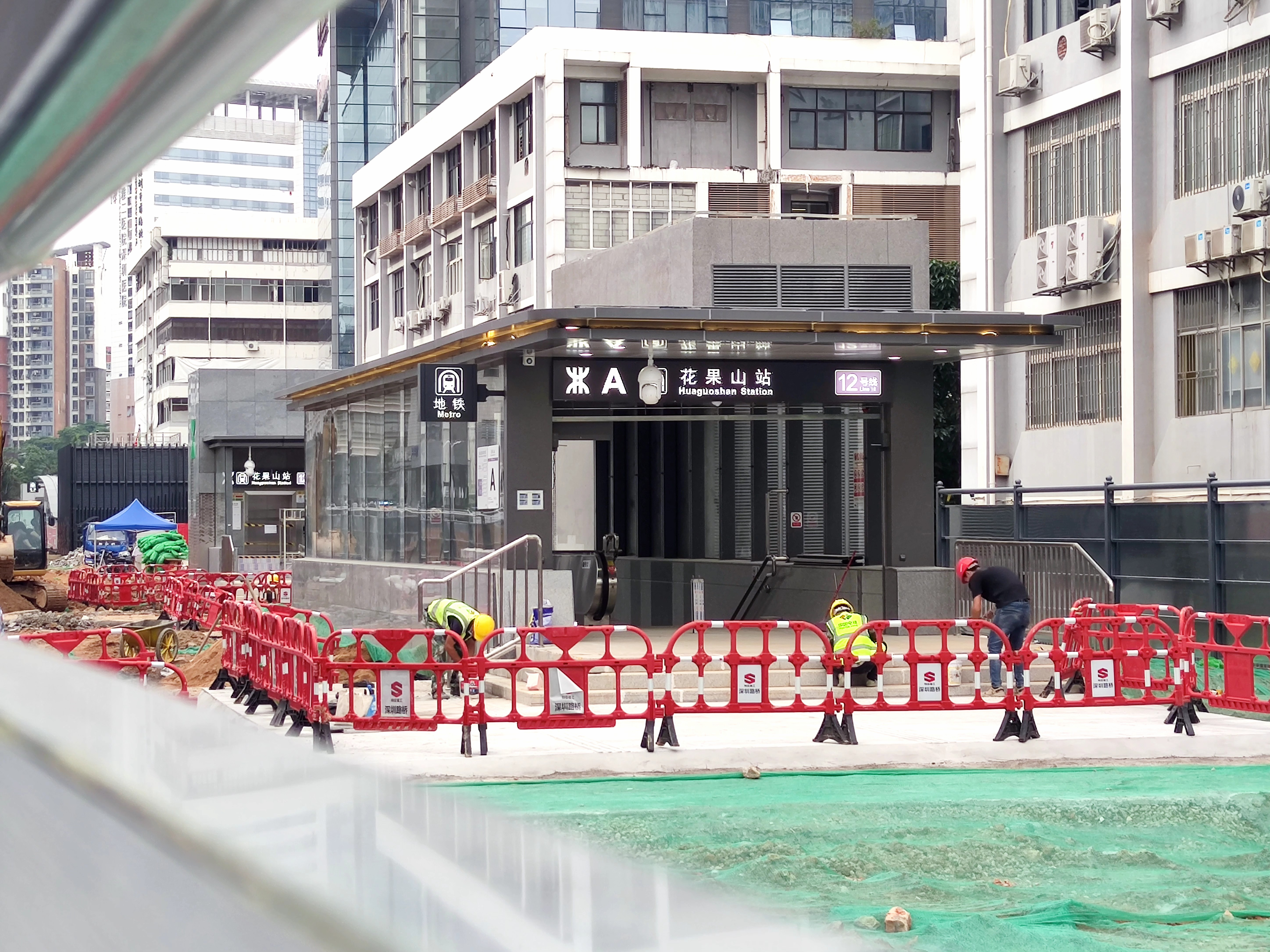
Entrance A

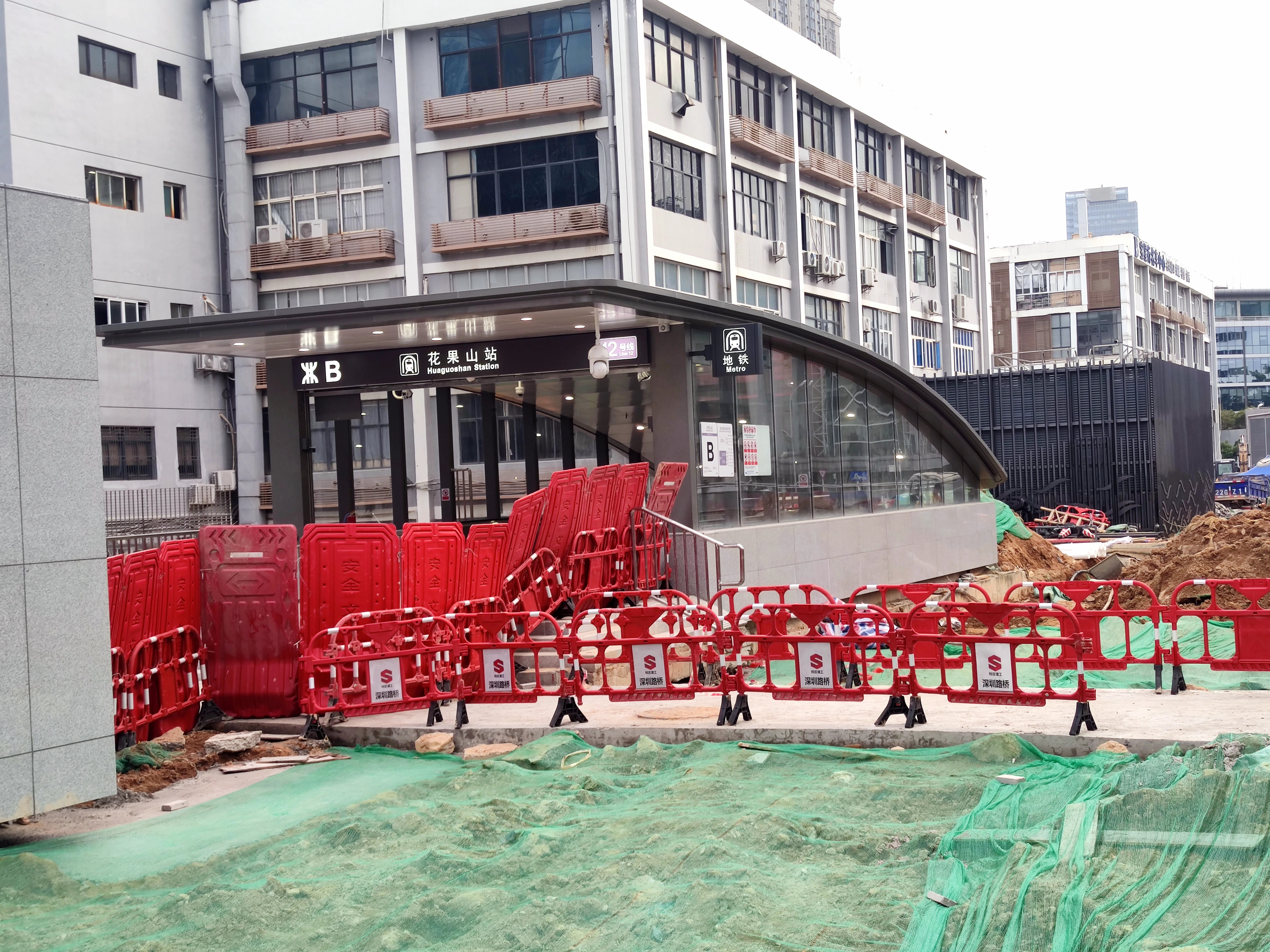
Entrance B

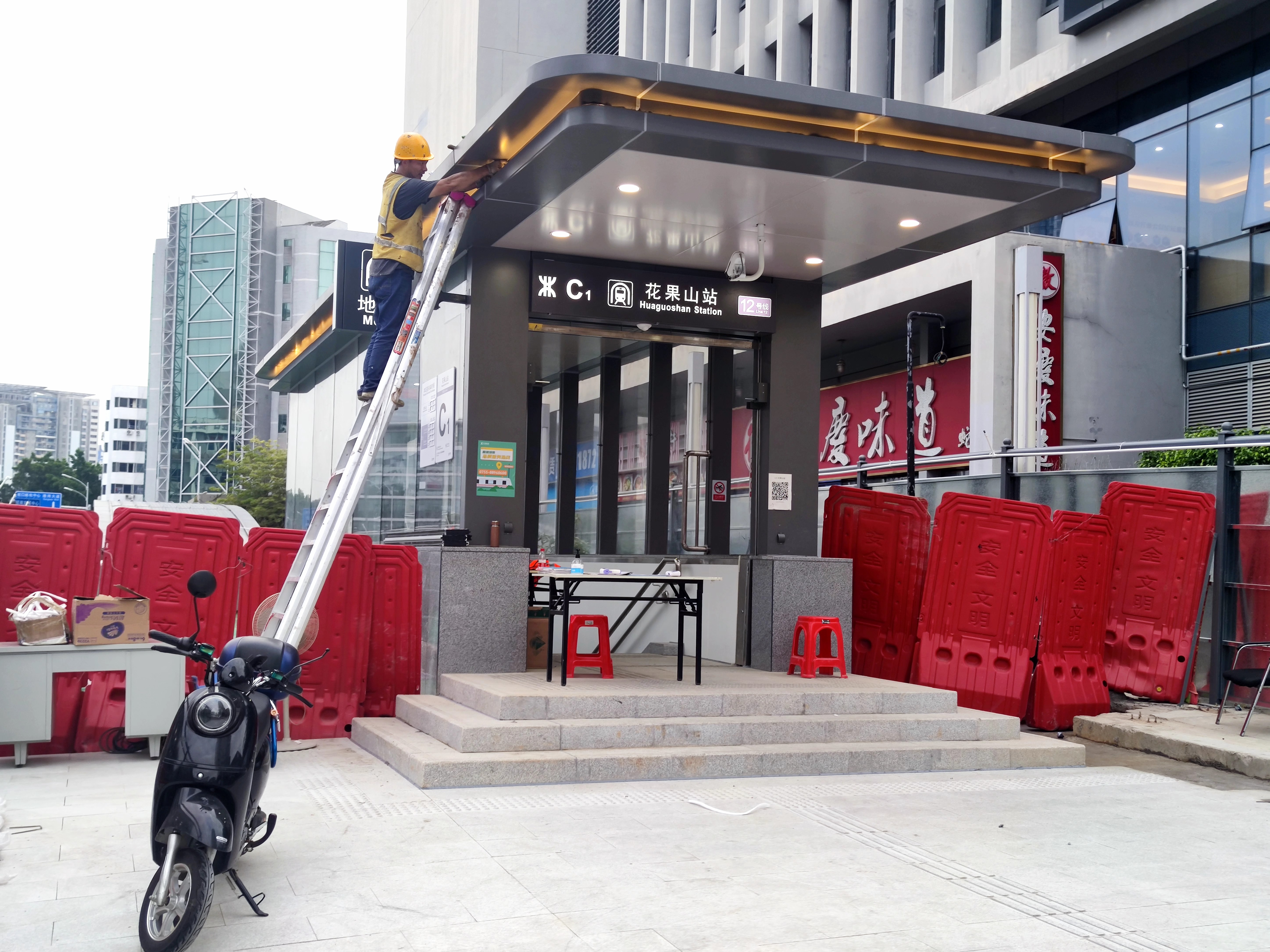
Entrance C1

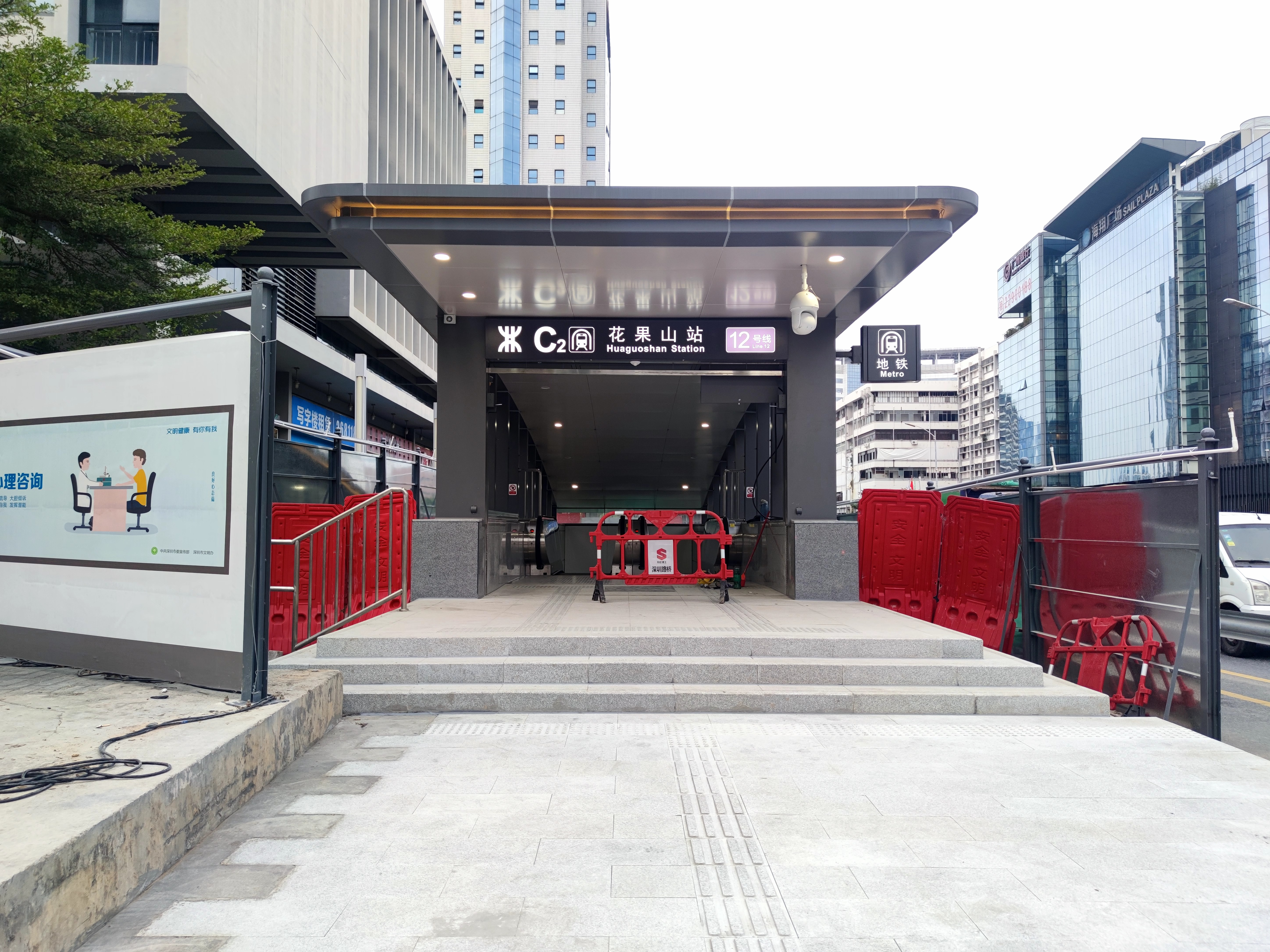
Entrance C2

== Gallery ==
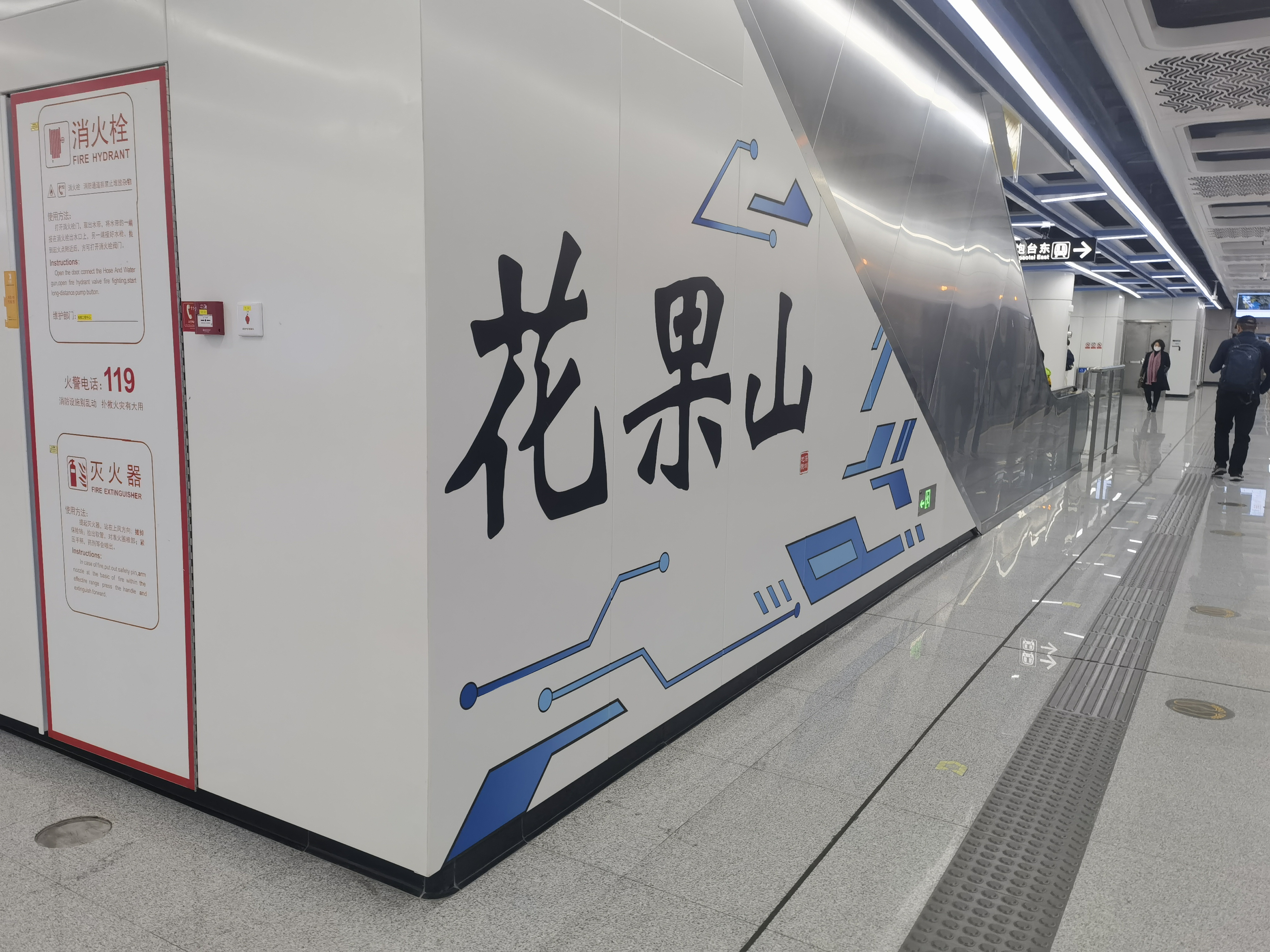
Calligraphy

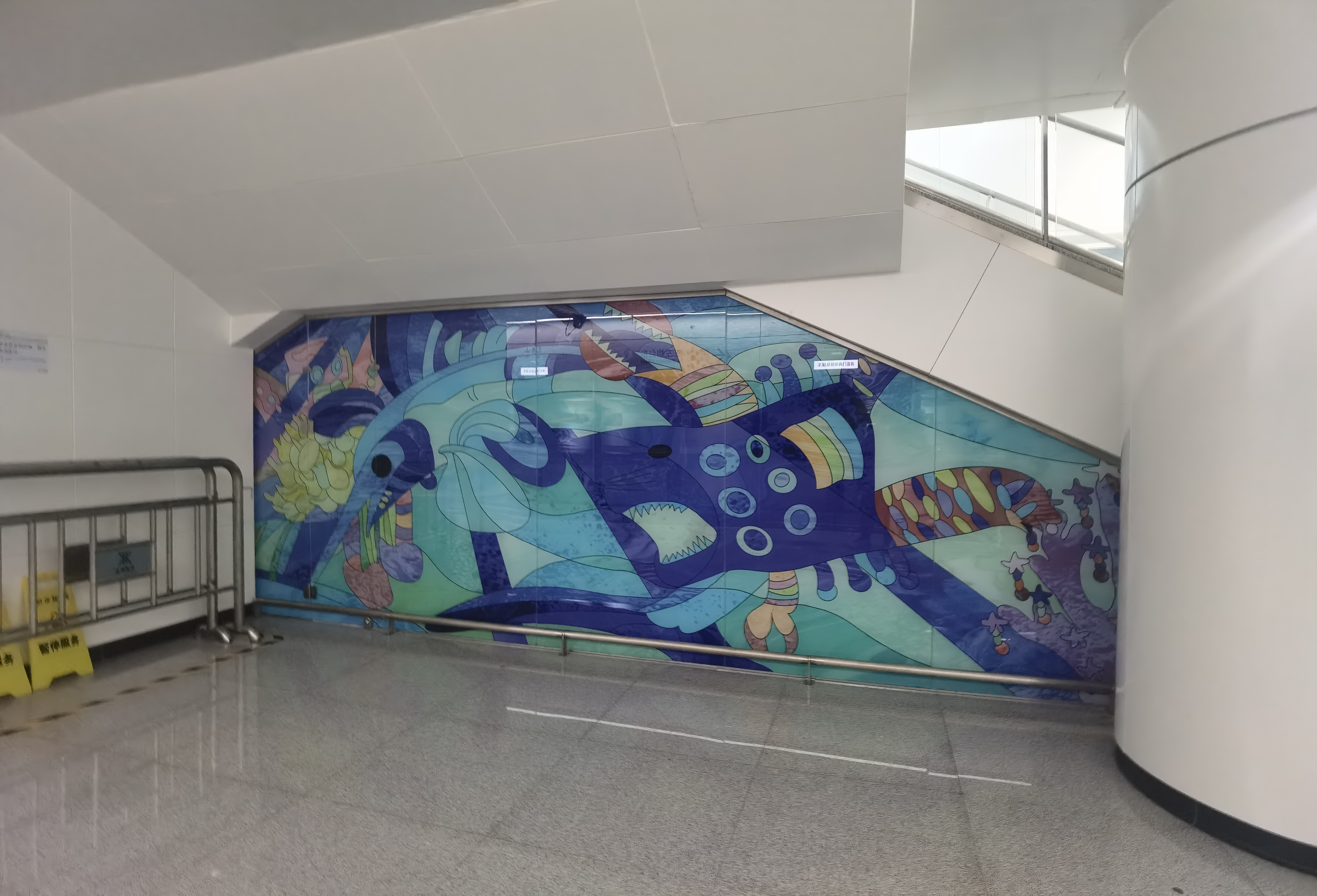
Art wall
