= Sihai station =

Shenzhen Metro Line 12 station

Sihai 四海
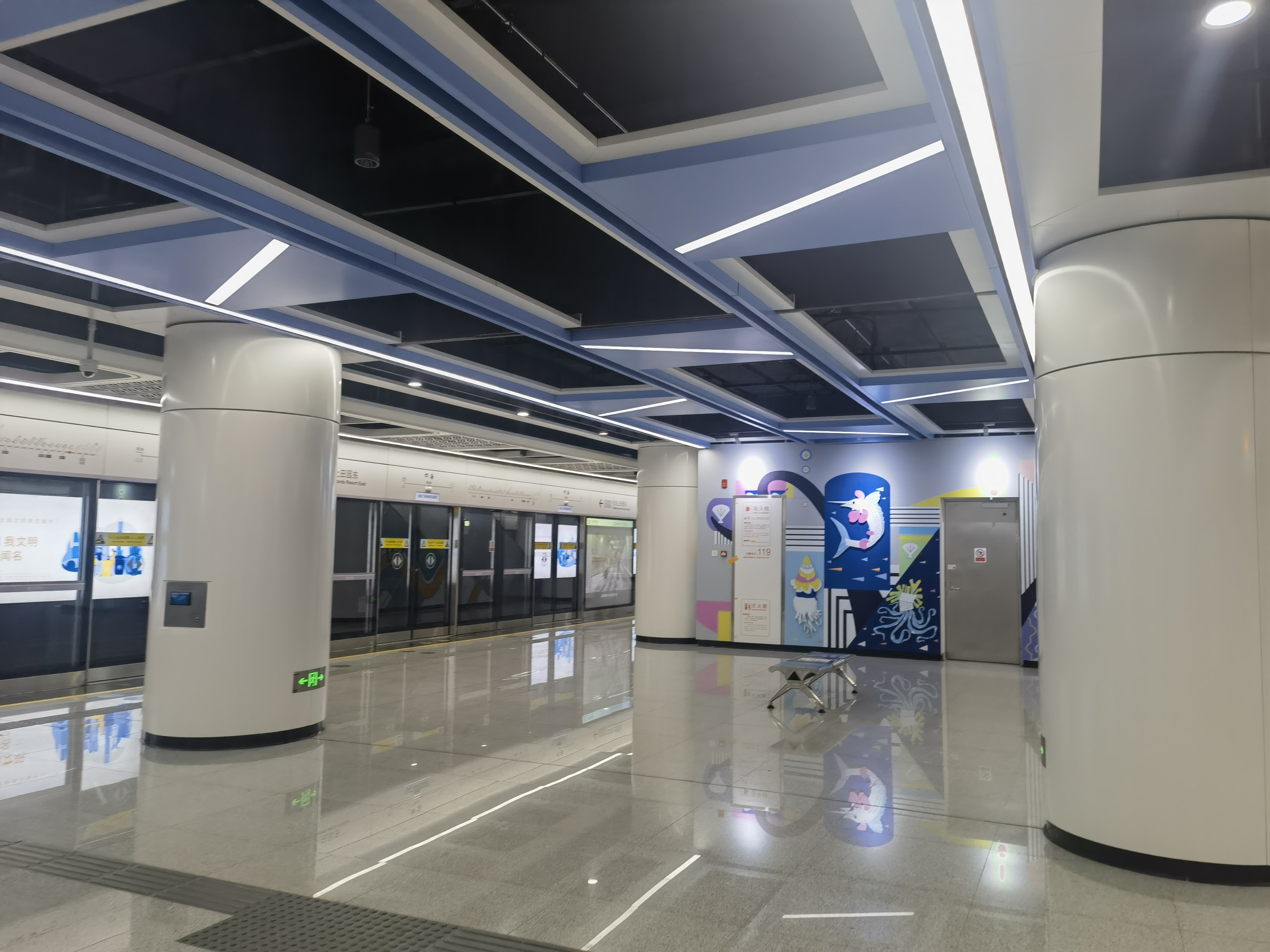
- Platform

Chinese name
- Chinese: 四海
Transcriptions
Standard Mandarin
- Hanyu Pinyin: Sìhǎi
Yue: Cantonese
- Yale Romanization: Seihói
- Jyutping: Sei3 Hoi2

General information
- Location: Intersection of Gongye 8th Road and Nanhai Boulevard; Nanshan District, Shenzhen, Guangdong; China
- Coordinates: 22°30′11.81″N 113°55′1.38″E
- Operator: Shenzhen Line 12 Rail Transit Co., Ltd (Shenzhen Metro Group and PowerChina PPP)
- Line: Line 12
- Platforms: 2 (1 island platform)
- Tracks: 2

Construction
- Structure type: Underground
- Accessible: Yes

History
- Opened: 28 November 2022 (3 years ago)

Services
Preceding station	Shenzhen Metro	Following station
Nanyou towards Songgang	Line 12	Huaguoshan towards Zuopaotai East
Location

Sihai station (Chinese: 四海站; pinyin: Sìhǎi Zhàn; Cantonese Yale: Seihói Jaahm) is a metro station on Line 12 of Shenzhen Metro. It opened on 28 November 2022.

== Station layout ==
The station has an island platform under Chuangye Road.

G	–	Exits A, D-F, J
B1F; Concourse	Lobby	Ticket Machines, Customer Service, Station Control Room
B2F; Platforms	Platform	12 towards Songgang (Nanyou)
B2F; Platforms	Island platform, doors will open on the left
B2F; Platforms	Platform	12 towards Zuopaotai East (Huaguoshan)

=== Entrances/exits ===
The station has 5 points of entry/exit, with Exits D and J being accessible via elevators.

Exit	Destination
Exit A	Nanhai Boulevard (E), Gongye 8th Road (S), China Merchants Garden City Phase 3, Shekou People's Hospital, Fenghua Grand Theater, Shenzhen Keaisai International School, Sihai Park, Shekou Sports Center
Exit D	Nanhai Boulevard (E), Gongye 8th Road (N), CITY Garden City, Walmart Shekou Store, Decathlon Shekou Store, Sihai Community
Exit E	Nanhai Boulevard (W), Gongye 8th Road (N), Merchants Garden City Phase 1, Hanshan Yuehai City
Exit F	Under construction
Exit J	Nanhai Boulevard (W), Gongye 8th Road (S), Haofang Leisure House, Yucai Three Small, Garden City Digital Building, Huacai Garden

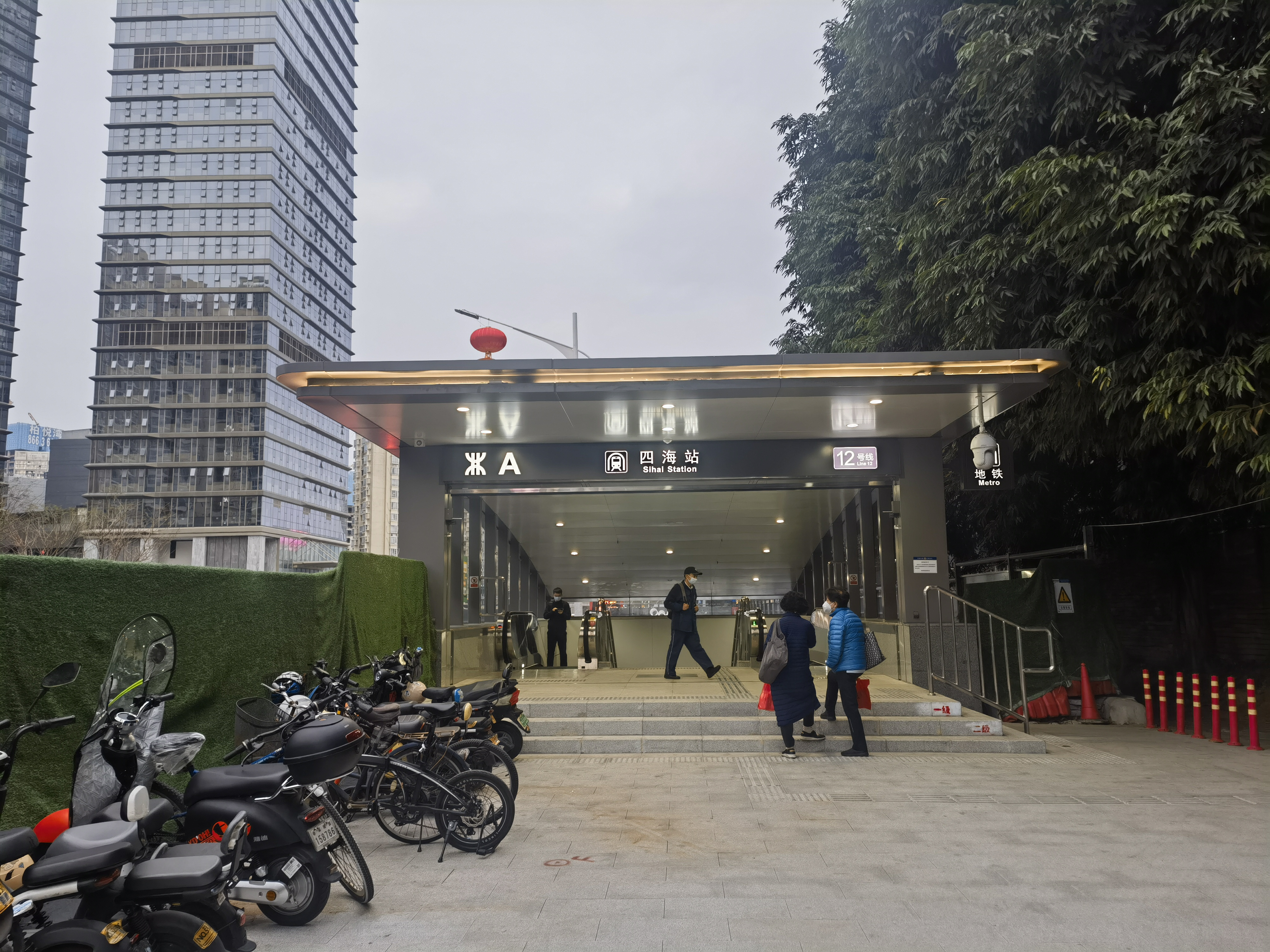
Entrance A

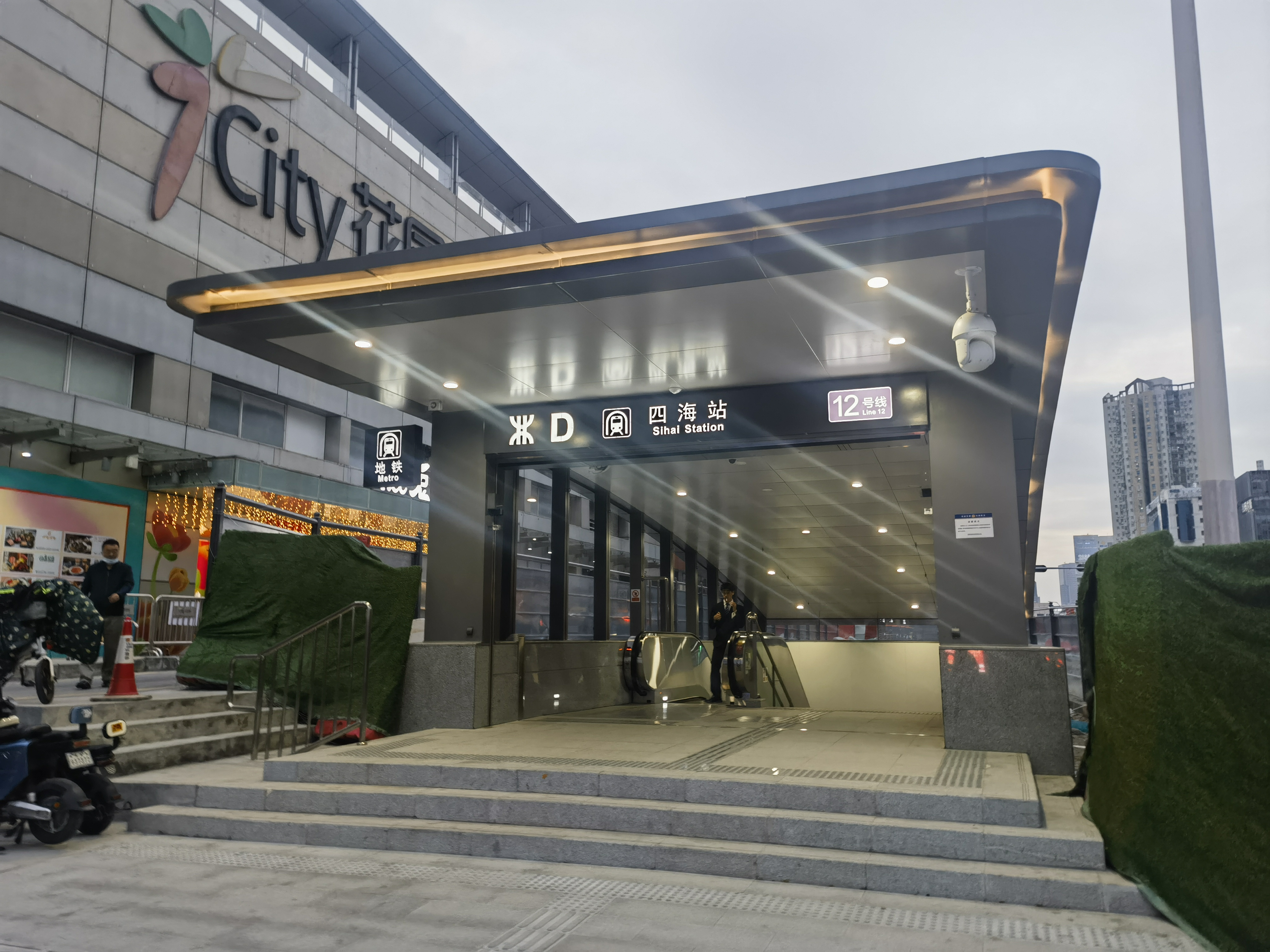
Entrance D

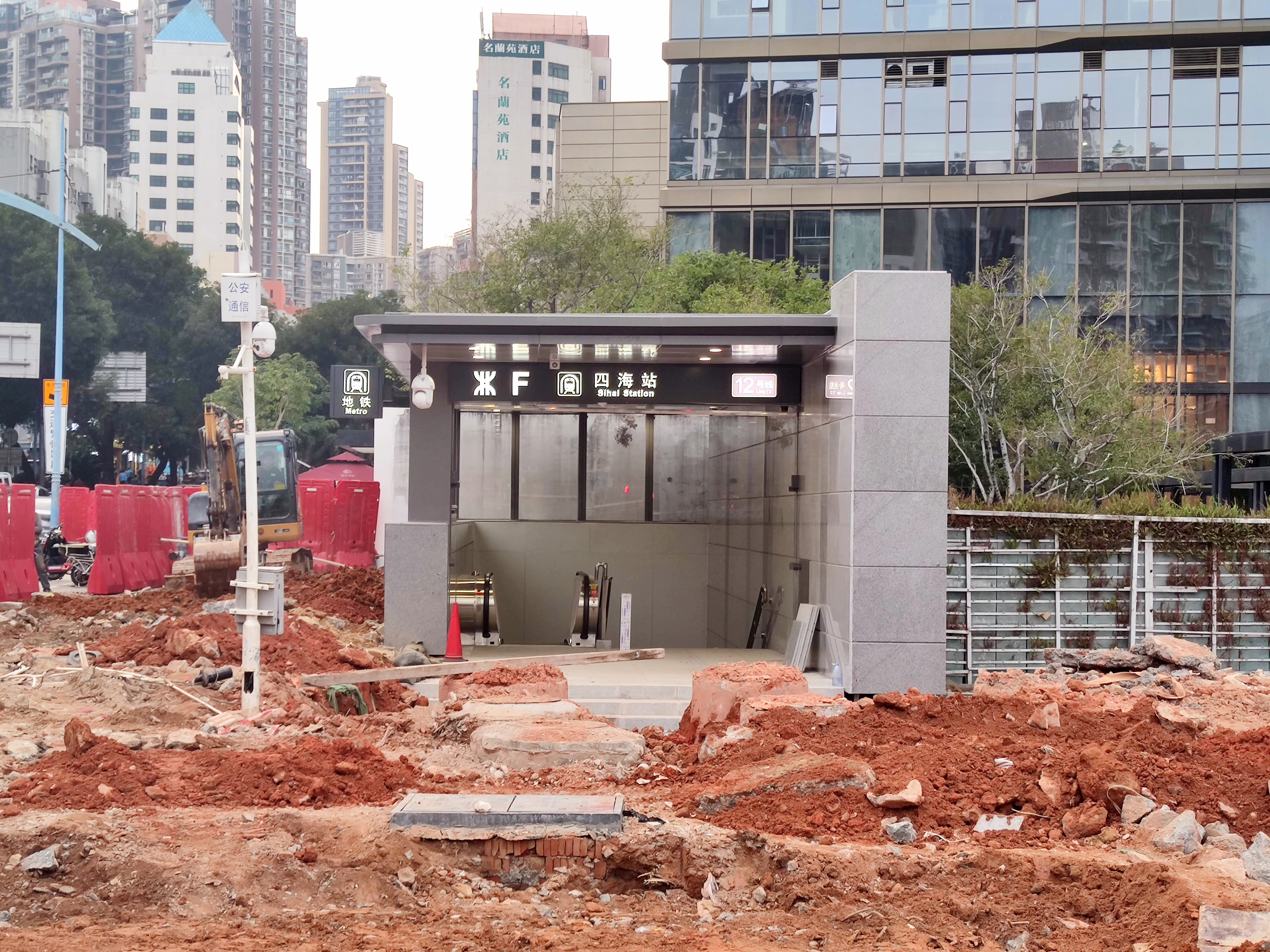
Entrance F

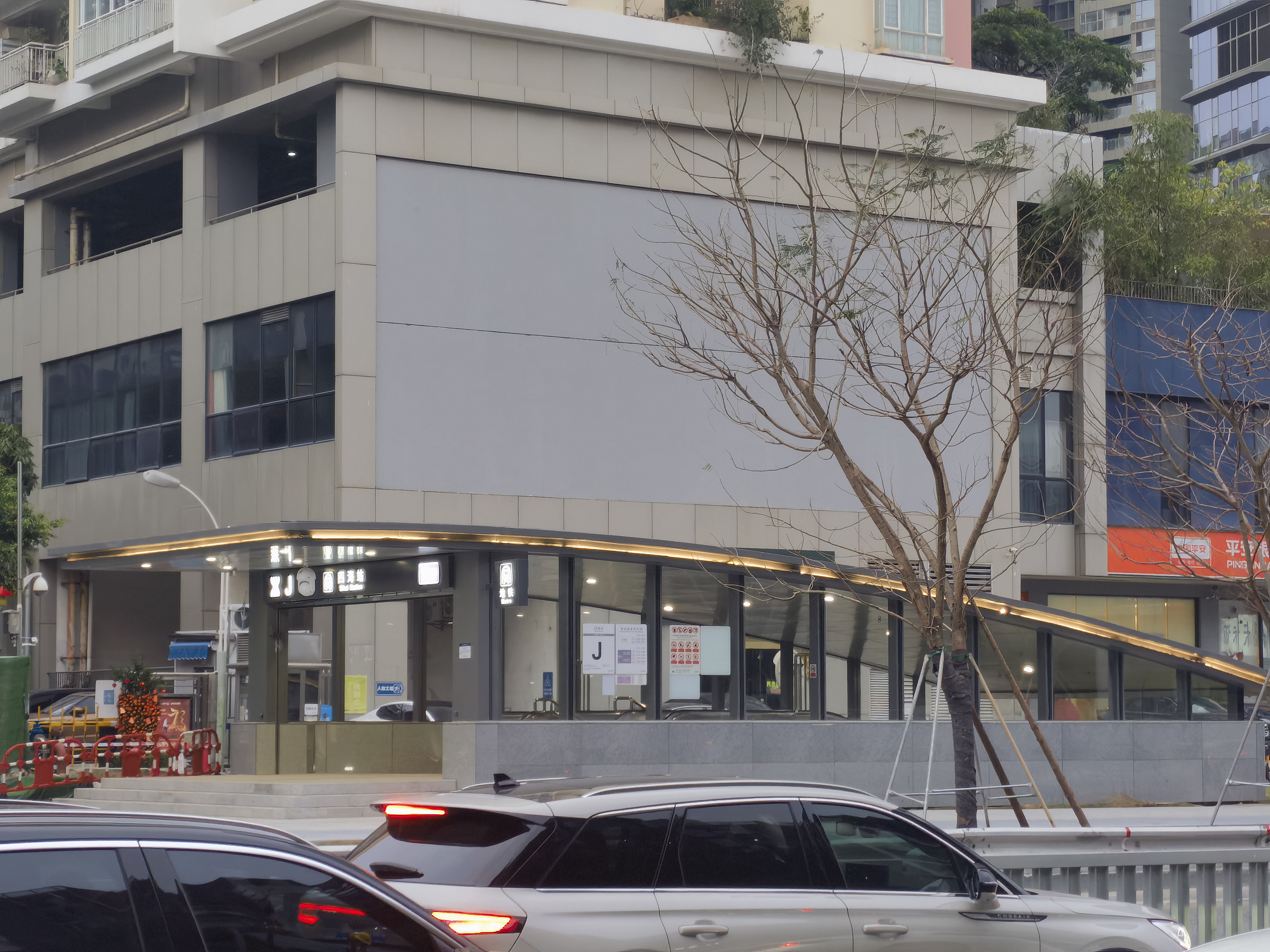
Entrance J

== Gallery ==
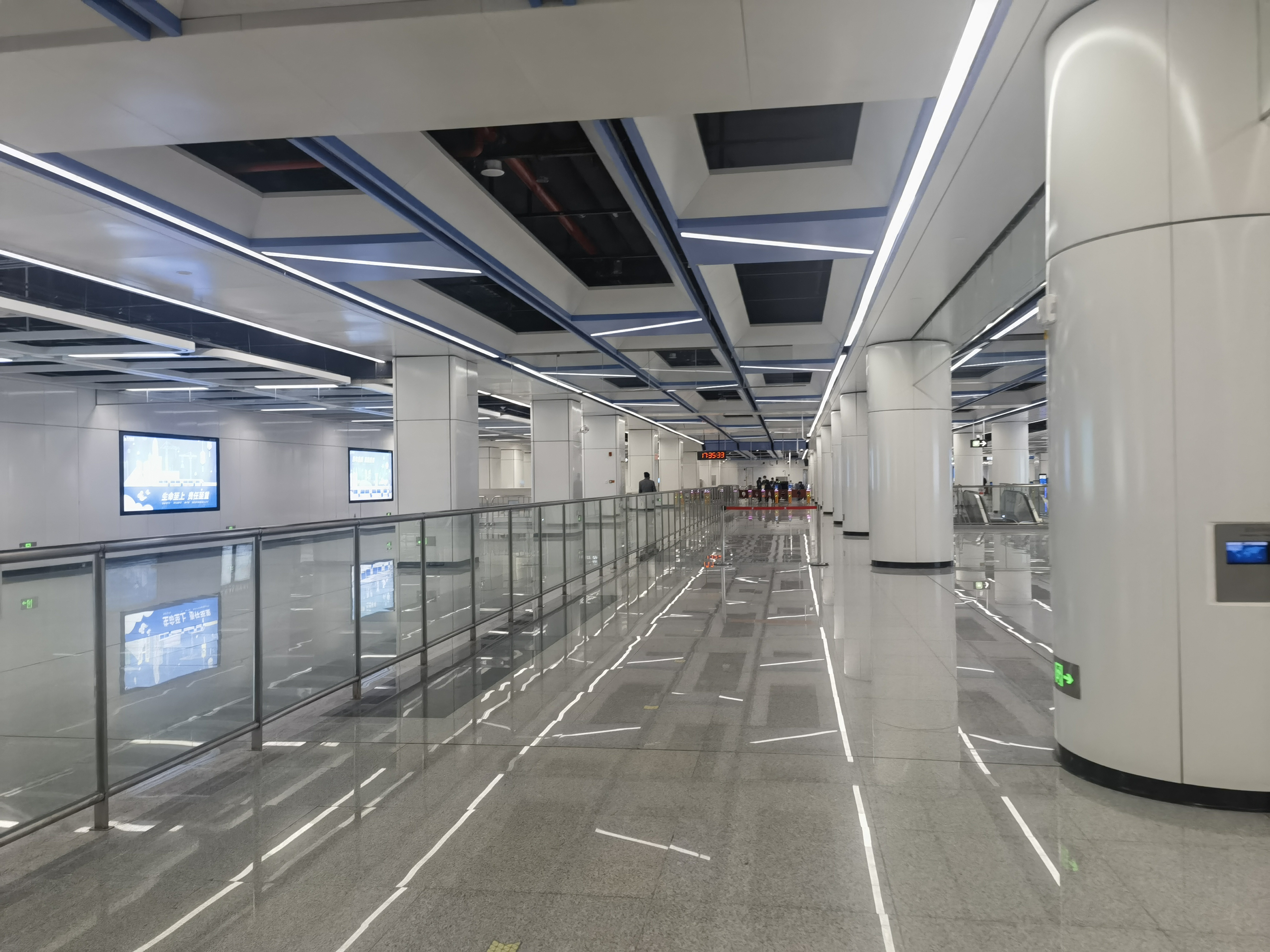
Concourse

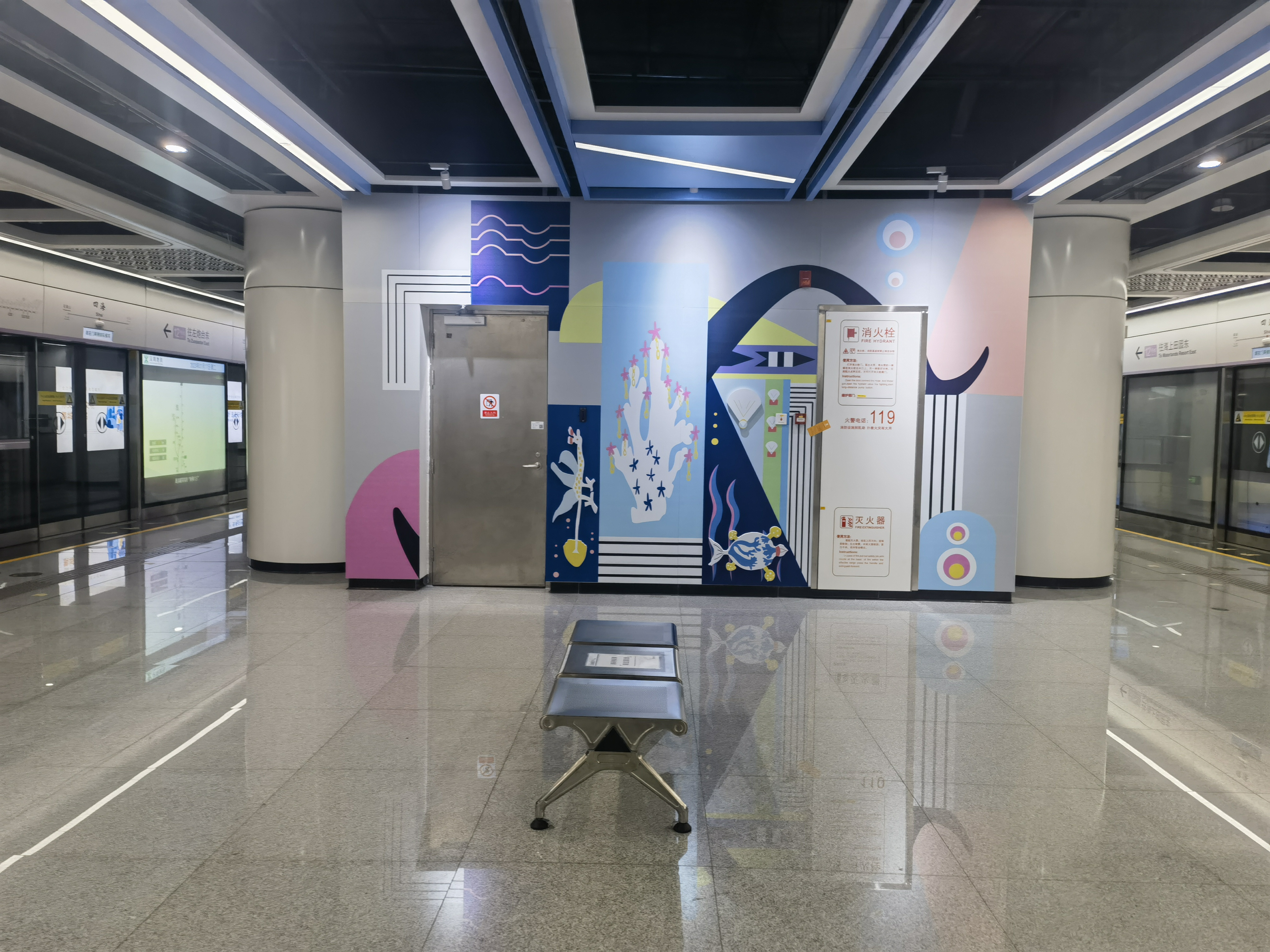
Art installation 1

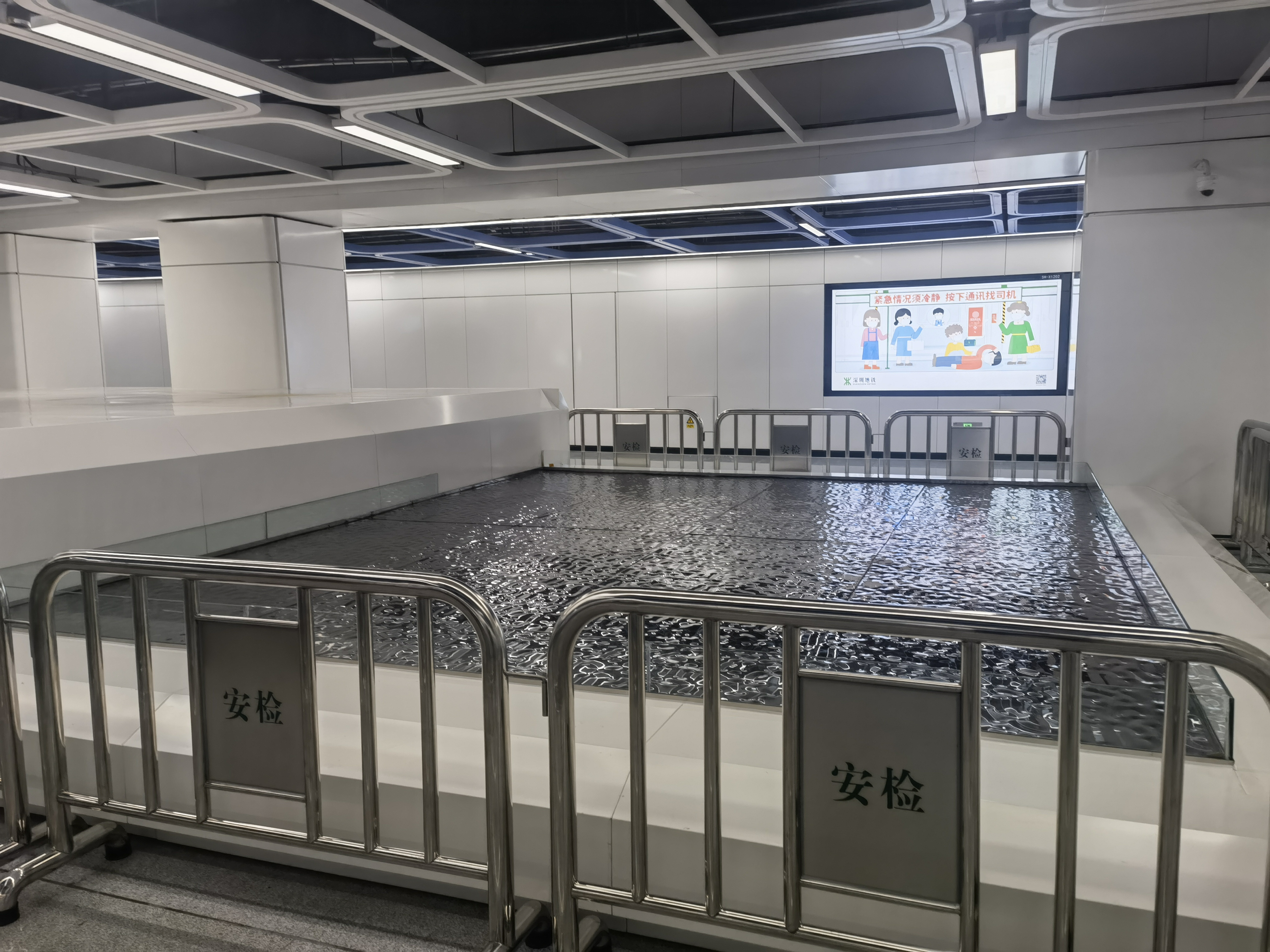
Art installation 2

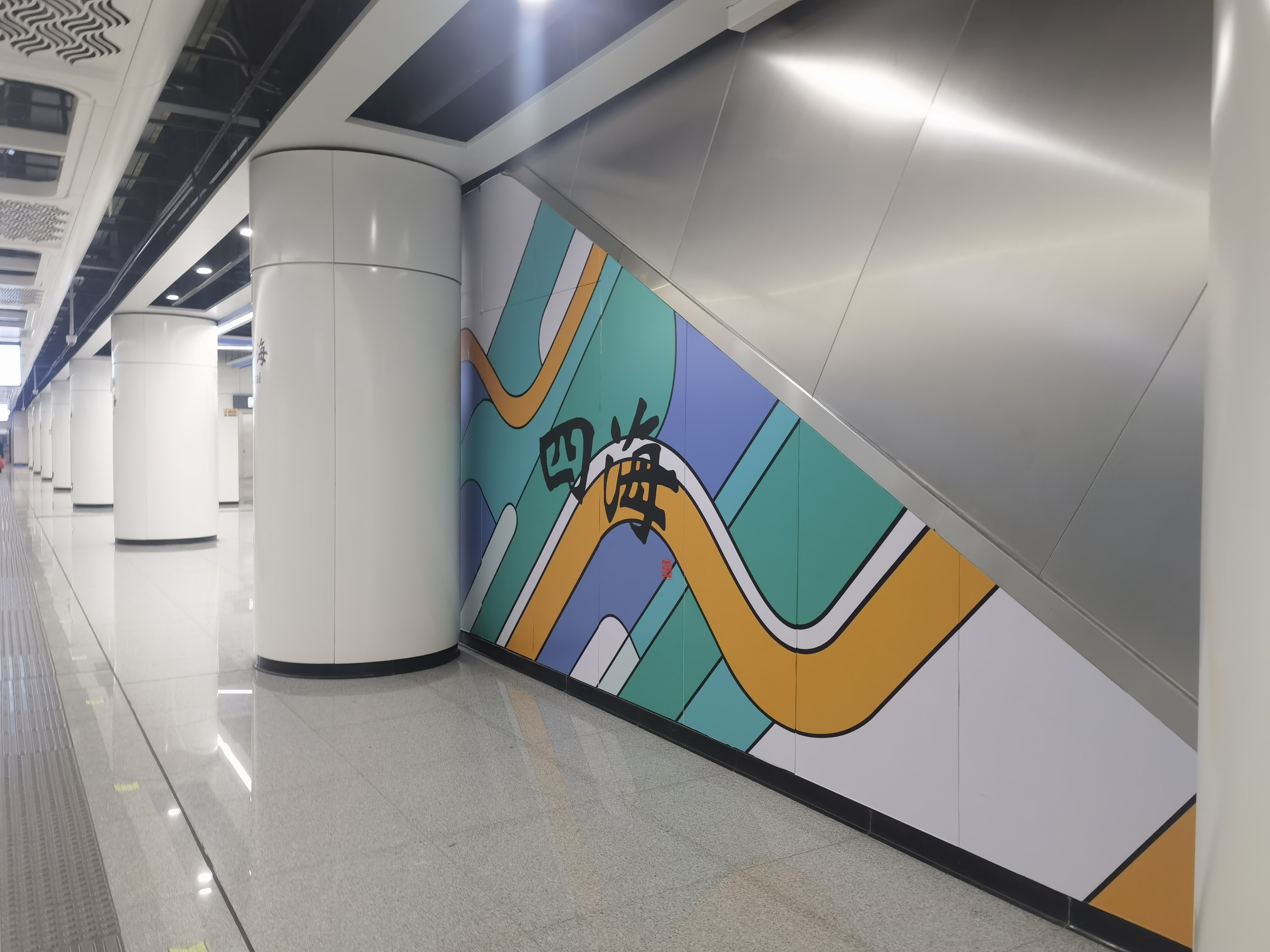
Calligraphy

== Future development ==
In 2027, this station will feature an interchange with Line 15.
