= Korean International School in Shenzhen =

Private school in Shenzhen, China

Korea International School in Shenzhen
- 심천한국국제학교 深圳韩国国际学校

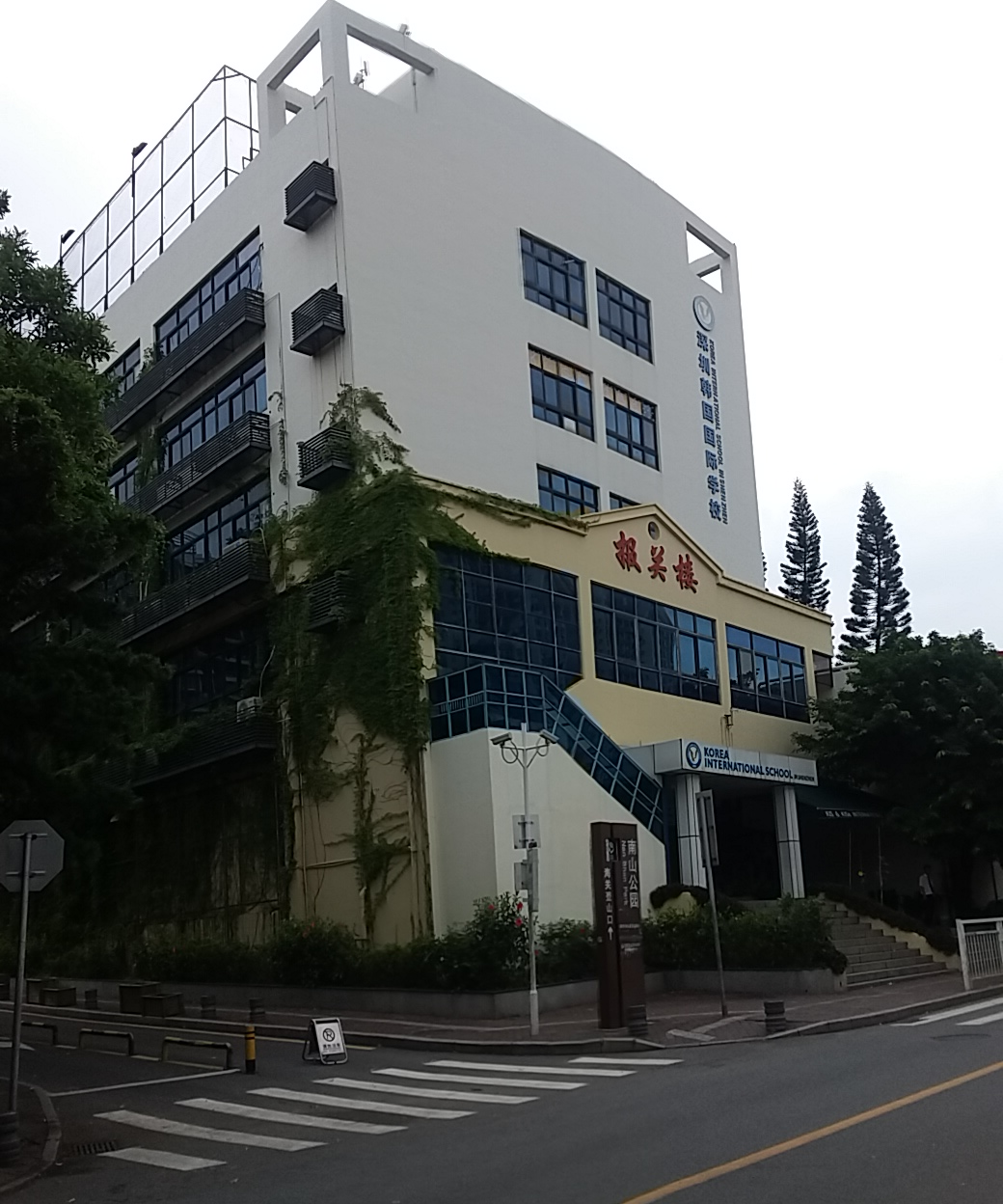

Location
- China
- Coordinates: 22.497418°N 113.918096°E

Information
- Type: Private, International, Primary, Secondary
- Motto: An Emblem Eptimizing a Great Leap Towaard a Wider World
- Established: 2005
- School district: Shenzhen Nanshan District
- Chairman: Park Jong Jin
- Principal: Suh Young Jin
- Head of school: E. Robbie G. Barfield
- Staff: 50+
- Faculty: 30+
- Grades: PK-G12
- Enrollment: 250 students
- Education system: International
- Colors: Blue, Gold and White
- Mascot: Eagles

Korean International School in Shenzhen

Chinese name
- Simplified Chinese: 深圳韩国国际学校
- Traditional Chinese: 深圳韓國國際學校
- Literal meaning: Korea International School in Shenzhen
Transcriptions
Standard Mandarin
- Hanyu Pinyin: Shēnzhèn Hánguó Guójì Xuéxiào
Yue: Cantonese
- Jyutping: sam1 zan3 hon4 gwok3 gwok3 zai3 hok6 haau6

Korean name
- Hangul: 심천한국국제학교

The Korea International School of Shenzhen (KIS; Korean: 심천한국국제학교, Chinese: 深圳韩国国际学校) is an international school that opened in 2005. KIS is located near the Nanshan Mountain, within the Shekou Industrial Zone, Nanshan District. KIS is a private international school with 300 students ranging from kindergarten to high school. However, KIS has only one campus, despite the large number of students. This figure has risen over time and continues to rise.

It is one of eight schools in Shenzhen designated for the children of foreign workers as of 2018. The school has an English-language elementary school section, KIS Elementary School in Shenzhen or KISe International Elementary School (KISe).

This school is served by Shenzhen Metro's Huaguoshan station.

== See also ==
- Education in Shenzhen
- Koreans in China
