= Wu Tingju =

Wu Tingju (吳廷舉, c. 1460 – 1526) was a Ming official who, as Administration Commissioner (governor) of Guangdong, was an early advocate of trade openness during the reign of Emperor Zhengde. Historian Timothy Brook wrote that Wu's policy positions illustrate the inaccuracy of the "truth universally acknowledged that the Chinese state was historically hostile to foreign trade and that, if the Chinese were in want of anything, it was the freedom of trade."

Not much is known of Wu Tingju's biography. He passed the metropolitan examination in 1487 and became a magistrate in Shunde District, where he stayed until 1497. In 1489, he proceeded to the destruction of illegally established temples. A promoter of education, he used the materials from the destroyed temples to repair school buildings and academies. He returned to Guangdong as Assistant Administration Commissioner in 1506, and after a period of disgrace and punishment in Beijing, once again in 1514.

Wu Tingju's role in economic policy debates is documented in the Ming Shilu or "Veritable Record" of the Zhengde Emperor, a compilation of court deliberations on administrative and other issues. In contrast to the occasionally more liberal stance under the Yuan dynasty, the Hongwu Emperor at the start of the Ming dynasty had imposed all foreign trade to be channeled through the highly formalized tributary system, implying a prohibition of private foreign trade even though this could probably never be universally enforced. Wu Tingju, instead, appears to have viewed private foreign trade as a valuable source of wealth and fiscal revenue. The memoirs written by various court officials against him and kept in the Veritable Record suggest that he "was seen in the late 1510s as the official leading the charge for arguing for the benefits of foreign trade to China, in particular the fiscal benefits of that trade; or in other words, the champion of the idea of separating trade and diplomacy."

Wu Tingju's tenure as Administration Commissioner coincided with the first incursions of Portuguese navigators into the Pearl River Delta, by Jorge Álvares in 1513, Rafael Perestrello in 1516, and the diplomatic mission of Tomé Pires and Fernão Pires de Andrade in 1517. The Portuguese - referred to in contemporaneous Chinese sources as "Franks" (Folangji, 佛郎機) - were unable to secure tributary state status, and their assertive behavior contributed to generally negative attitudes against foreign traders at the imperial court, thwarting Wu Tingju's open stance. Following the death of the Zhengde Emperor in April 1521, the Jiajing Emperor in 1525 banned all navigation close to the coast of China, other than small fishing vessels, effectively ending legal private foreign trade for several decades.

== See also ==
- Yuan Geng
