= Sea World Culture and Arts Center =

Cultural center in Shenzhen, China

- Simplified Chinese: 海上世界文化艺术中心
- Traditional Chinese: 海上世界文化藝術中心
Transcriptions
Standard Mandarin
- Hanyu Pinyin: Hǎishàng Shìjiè Wénhuà Yìshù Zhōngxīn
Yue: Cantonese
- Jyutping: hoi2 soeng6 sai3 gaai3 man4 faa3 ngai6 seot6 zung1 sam1

Sea World Culture and Arts Center
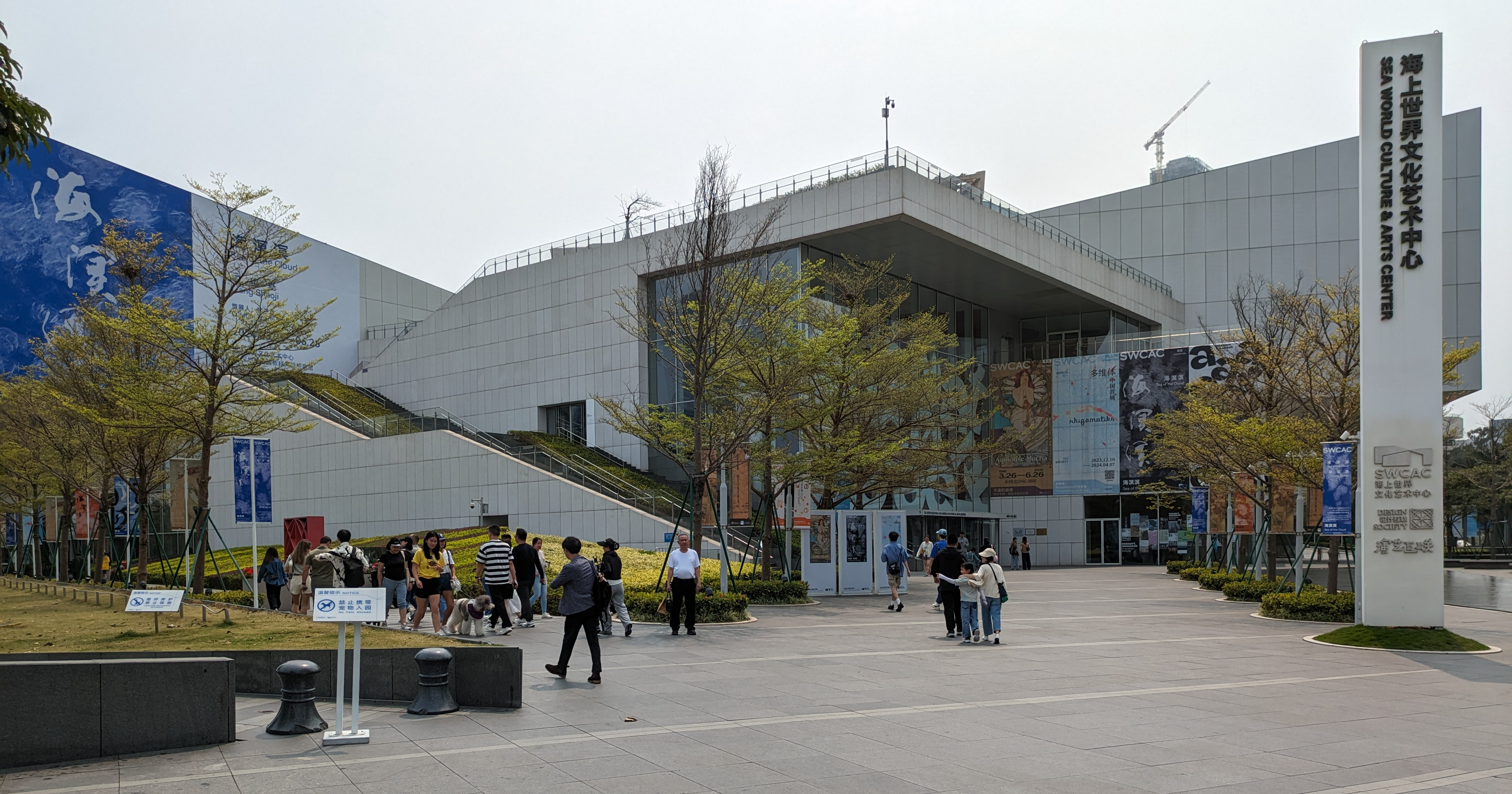
- Established: 2017
- Location: Shekou, Nanshan District, Shenzhen, PRC
- Coordinates: 22.483°N 113.912°E
- Architect: Fumihiko Maki
- Website: http://www.designsociety.cn

Sea World Culture and Arts Center is a waterfront situated multi-use culture and arts center within the greater Sea World development in Shekou, Shenzhen, China. The project is a joint venture between the state owned China Merchants Group and Great Britain's Victoria and Albert Museum. It is designed by the Japanese architect Fumihiko Maki. Completed in 2017 the structure is built in two parts. The first part the "sculptural podium" contains the museum and retail stores and the second made up of "three cantilevered volumes" houses a theater, a restaurant and a "multi purpose hall".

Located in Shekou, Nanshan District, Shenzhen, this is the Pritzker Prize winning architect Maki's first building in the PRC.

The park around the building was also designed by Maki and associates in collaboration with the landscape architecture firm Studio on Site. In front of the building is a statue of Yuan Geng, a foundational figure for Shekou, with a bilingual inscription in Chinese and English.

The total cost was 1.3 billion yuan ($196 million U.S. dollars).

== Museums & Galleries ==
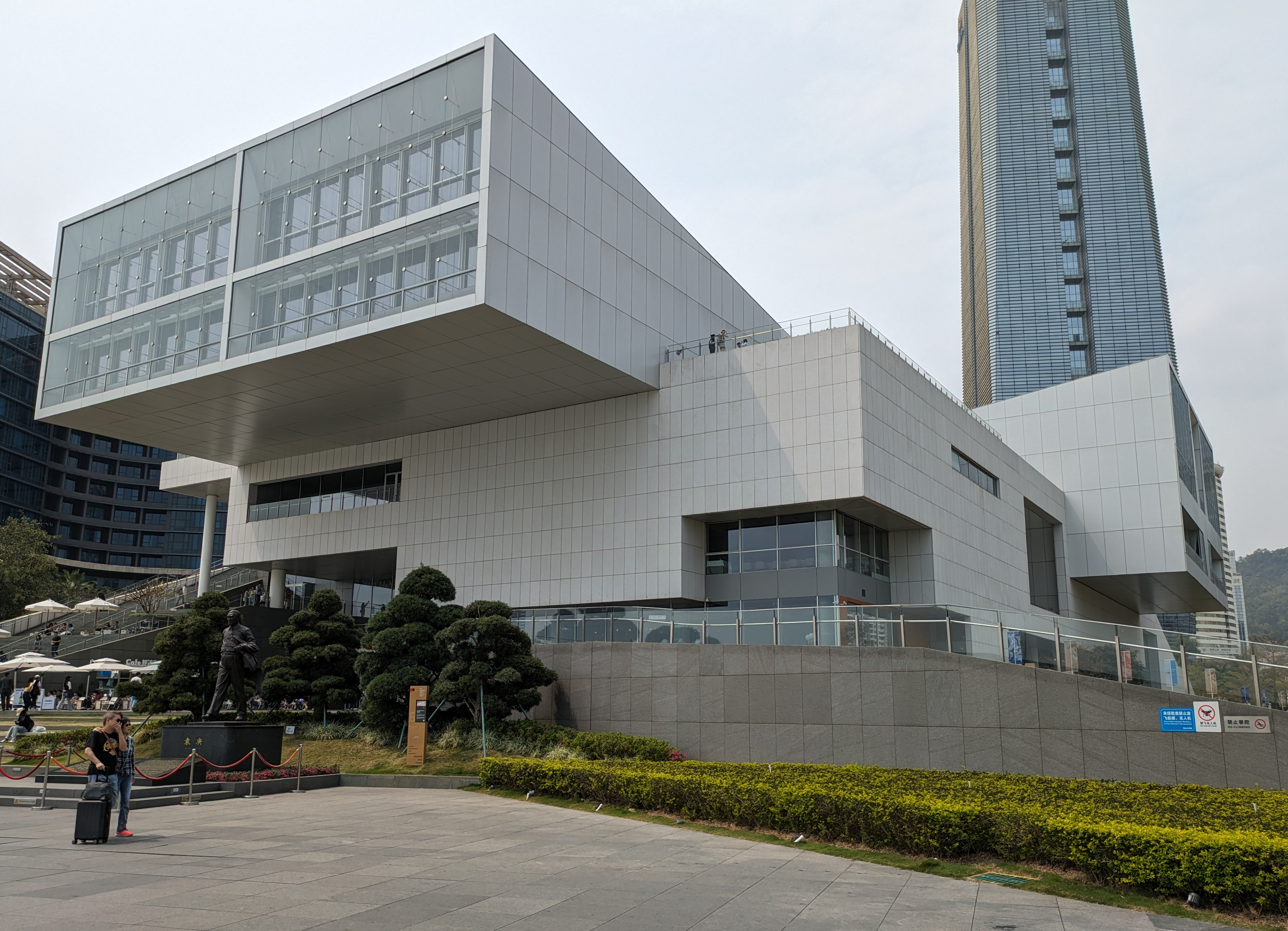
Sea World Culture and Arts Center

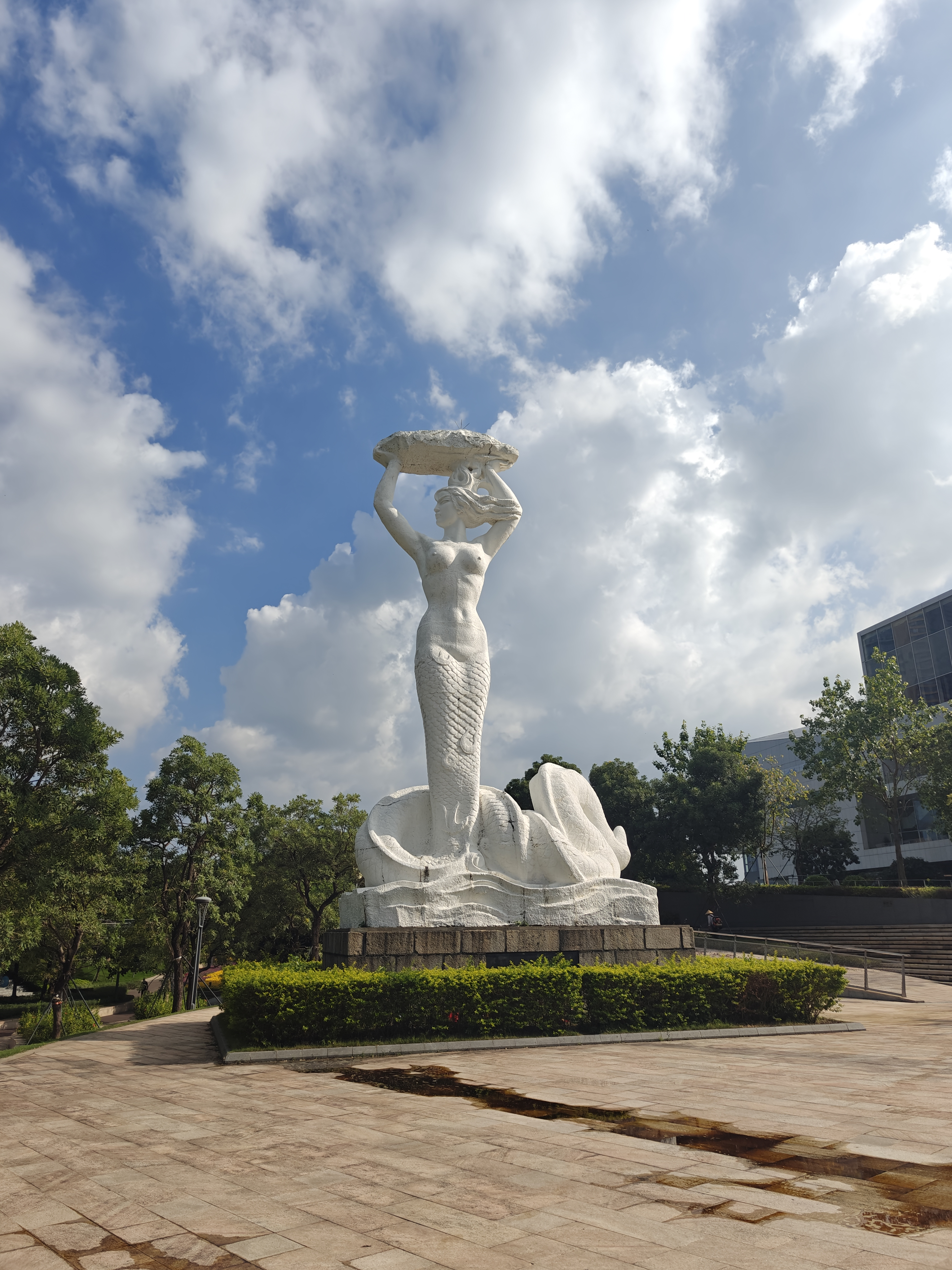
Mermaid statue at the center

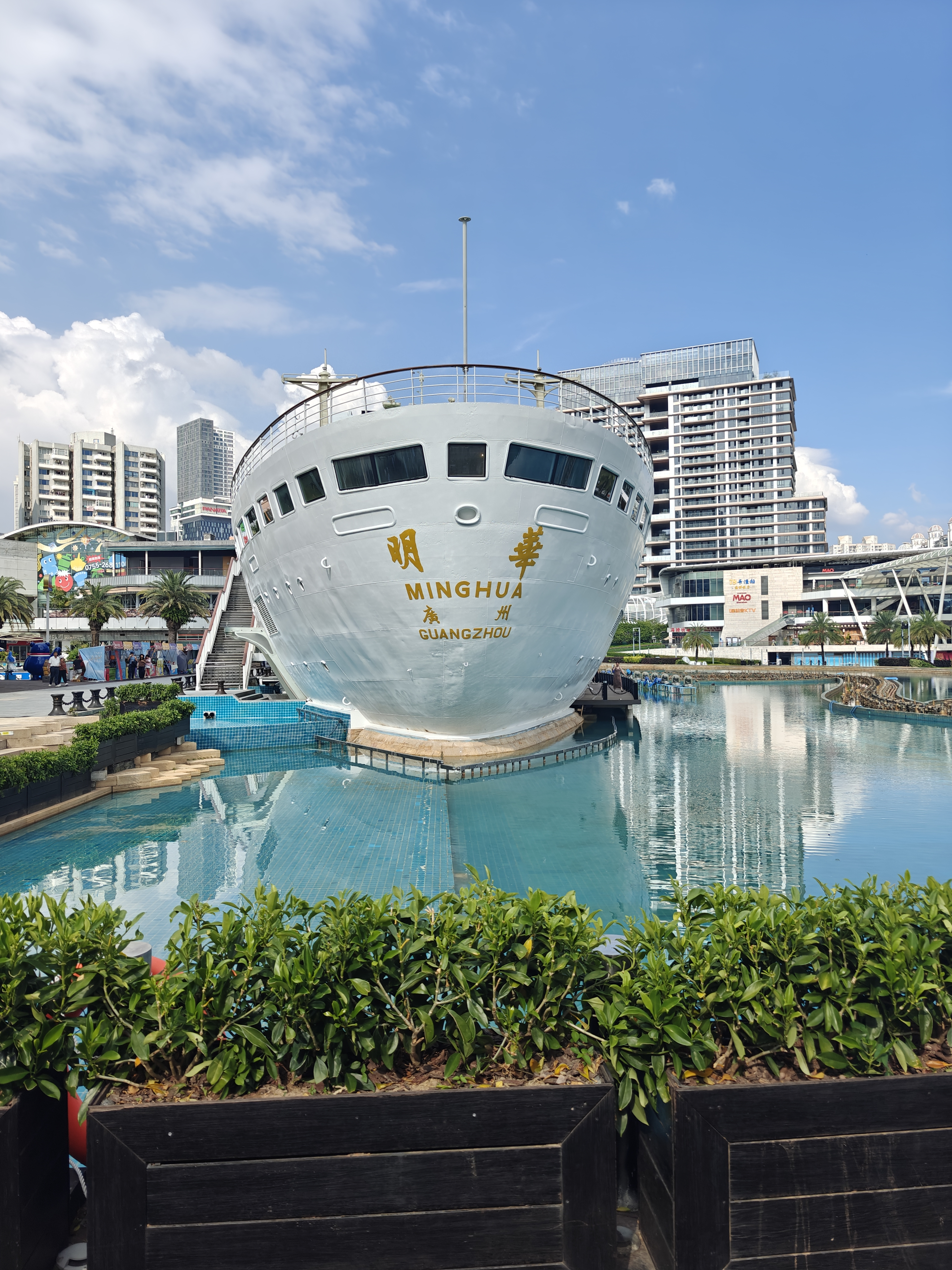

One museum is the Shekou Museum of Reform and Opening Up, on the center's third floor.

Another is the V&A Gallery, managed by Design Society, a group run jointly by the Victoria and Albert Museum and the SWCAC.

== Education ==
The SWCAC hosts educational events for local schools, hosted by Design Society. These include annual events such as the Nanshan School Makerfaire and MakeFashion Edu Runway show, as well as ongoing classes such as Design Thinking classes and student gallery tours.
