= Minghua (ship) =

French cruise ship

Coordinates: 22°29′11″N 113°54′42″E

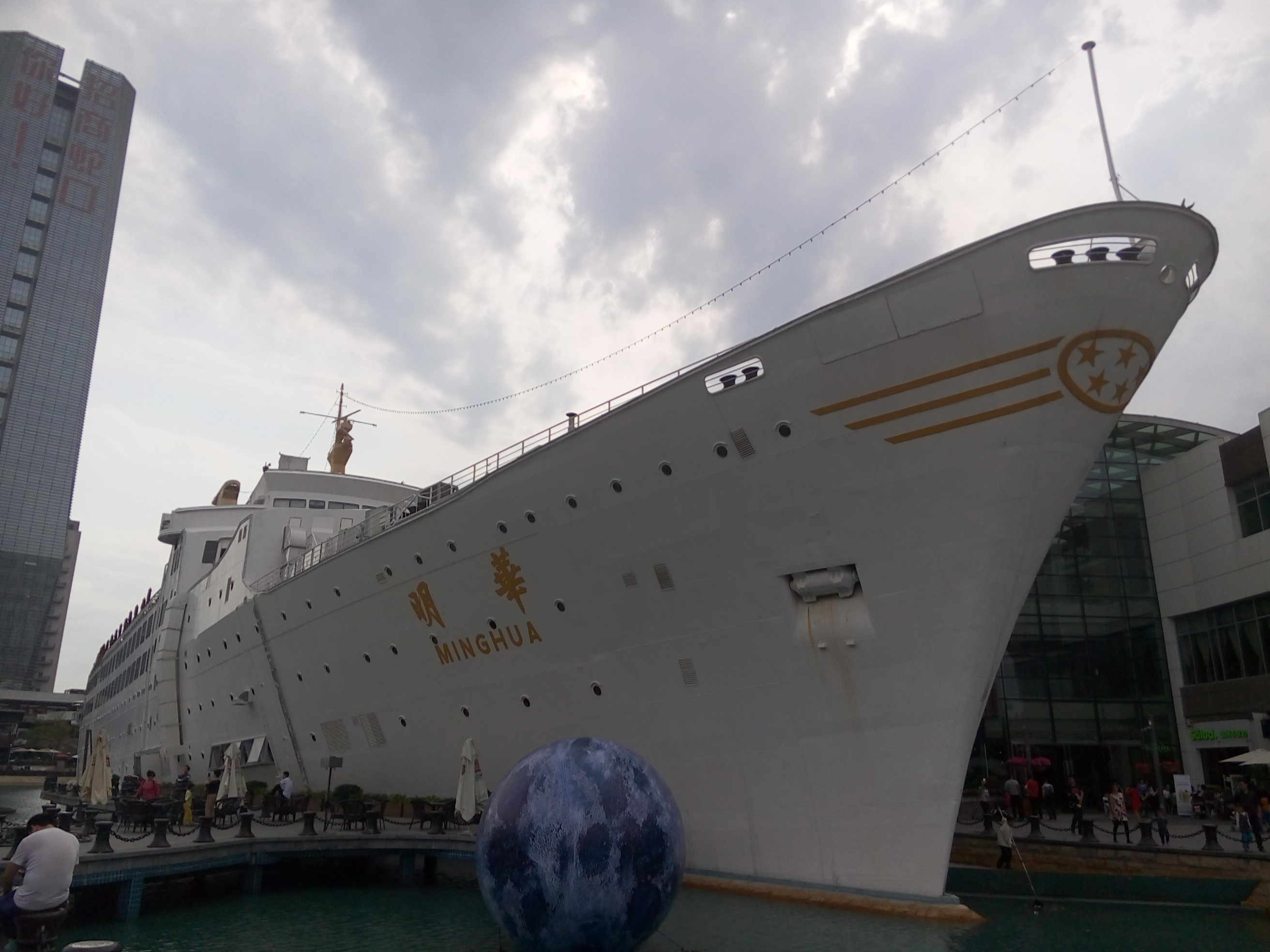
- Minghua as part of the Sea World Complex in Shenzhen, China

History
- Name: 1962–1973: Ancerville; 1973–1983: Minghua; 1983–present: (Part of Sea World, Shenzhen)
- Owner: 1962–1970: Compagnie de Navigation Paquet (CNP); 1970–1973: Novelle Compagnie de Paquebots (NCP); 1973–1983: China Ocean Shipping Co. (COSCO); 1983–present: China Merchants Group.
- Port of registry: 1962–1973: Marseille, France; 1973–1991: Guangzhou, China
- Builder: Chantiers de l'Atlantique
- Launched: April 5, 1962
- In service: September 5, 1962
- Out of service: August 17, 1983
- Identification: IMO number: 5015957
- Status: Landlocked as tourist attraction

General characteristics
- Tonnage: 14,225 gross register tons (GRT)
- Length: 168 meters
- Beam: 22 meters
- Propulsion: 2 x Burmeister & Wain Diesel Engines
- Speed: 22.5 knots
- Capacity: 756 passengers
- Crew: 173

Minghua (simplified Chinese: 明华; traditional Chinese: 明華; pinyin: Mínghuá; Jyutping: ming4 waa4), formerly MV Ancerville, is a 1962 French liner later converted to a cruise ship. Now landlocked, she is the centerpiece of the Sea World development in Shekou, Shenzhen, China.

== Design and construction ==
She was designed as a liner for the Compagnie de Navigation Paquet (CNP) to serve their Marseille to Dakar, Senegal route and built by Chantiers de l'Atlantique, Saint-Nazaire. She had a yacht like streamed profile and a unique accommodation arrangement. Her cabins were mostly located forward and the public rooms aft.

As built, she had three classes of accommodation, 171 first class, 342 second and 243 third class passengers. First and second in cabins, third class in four to ten berth dormitories. All the cabins and dormitories were facing outside so all had portholes or windows. There were open and enclosed promenades, bars, restaurants, a smoking room, library, children's playroom, photo lab, laundry and theatre. There were also two swimming pools aft and a small one forward, although the latter was short-lived. She was fitted with anti-rolling stabilizers and air conditioned throughout.

Her main engines were two Burmeister & Wain 12-cylinder two-stroke diesel engines with a 620mm bore and 900mm stroke fitted with Brown-Boveri turbochargers. Each engine was rated at 12,000 bhp at 200 rpm driving two propellers. During sea trials she reached 25 knots, her service speed was 22.5 knots.

She was launched on 5 April 1962 by the French President, Charles de Gaulle and entered service 5 September 1962, with a cruise to the Canary Islands.

Her original name comes from the town of Ancerville, Meuse in North-East France, the birthplace of Nicolas Paquet, the founder of CNP.

== French liner "Ancerville" (1962–1973) ==
Her usual route was from Marseille to Dakar lasting six days in each direction, calling at Casablanca and Tenerife on the outward voyage and Las Palmas and Casablanca again on the return, with sailings twice a month. She would occasionally make other stopovers en route at Alicante, Madeira or Tangiers. She also operated as a cruise ship during part of each year, increasingly so after 1970. When cruising, she was configured as a one class ship with passenger numbers limited to 500, the 3rd class dormitories were not used. Cruises were usually around the Mediterranean, West Africa, and later South America.

In 1970 her ownership was transferred from Compagnie de Navigation Paquet to a sister company, Nouvelle Compagnie de Paquebots (NCP), but continued on her usual routes. In July 1970, Ancerville rescued all passengers and crew of the burning and sinking liner Fulvia near the Canary Islands. The MV Ancerville appears in two Senegalese films: Black Girl (1966) and Touki Bouki (1973).

In early 1973, due to competition from airlines, the ship was sold to the China Ocean Shipping Company (COSCO) owned by the People's Republic of China (PRC) and renamed Minghua, meaning "Spirit of China". As COSCO needed the ship as soon as possible, her final cruise returning from the carnival in Rio de Janeiro was terminated abruptly in Tenerife instead of Marseille and the passengers flown home. She sailed to Malta for a dry dock inspection and ownership passed to COSCO in April 1973.

== TANZARA Railway project (1973–1978) ==
The Minghua operated from China to Dar Es Salaam, Tanzania under the management of COSCO to service the construction of the TAZARA Railway, the largest single foreign-aid project undertaken by China at the time. For five years she ferried Chinese workers to Tanzania to work on the railway being built from Tanzania to Zambia. At times she also acted as an accommodation ship in Dar Es Salaam.

== Refugee ship (June 1978) ==
In 1978, rising racial tensions in Vietnam between the Vietnamese and the ethnic Chinese who had settled there during colonial times caused a refugee crisis. Large numbers of the Chinese population attempted to flee to China. In June, the Chinese government dispatched the Minghua and one other ship from Canton (now Guangzhou), to help evacuate refugees. The ships departed with great ceremony to Vietnam. However, on arrival they remained offshore, whilst negotiations continued on when and where the ships could dock. After several weeks with no agreement reached, the mission was aborted.

== China-Japan friendship boat mission (May 1979) ==
In May 1979 the Minghua took a Chinese Government goodwill delegation of 600 people led by General Liao Chengzhi, the President of the China-Japan Friendship Association to Japan to help improve relations between the two countries. The Minghua spent a month cruising around Japan, arriving first at the western port of Shimonoseki and continuing on to Kyoto, Nagoya, Toyama, Tokyo and Nagasaki before returning to China.

Members of the delegation met with senior Japanese politicians, including Prime Minister Masayoshi Ohira, two former Prime Ministers, Kakuei Tanaka and Takeo Fukuda and the Japanese Foreign Minister Sunao Sonoda, as well as many influential business leaders. There was a notable meeting between General Su Yu and Ganri Yamashita, then the Director-General of the Defense Agency, the first meeting between a high official of the Chinese People's Liberation Army and a Japanese defense chief.

== Cruise ship based in Australia (1979–1983) ==
In 1979 a new company, Asian Pacific Cruises was formed in Sydney, Australia. They arranged to charter the Minghua to operate cruises from Australia to the South Pacific, Hong Kong, SE Asia, Japan and China. She was given an extensive refit in Hong Kong, and upon completion was able to accommodate 580 passengers. Her first voyage as a rebuilt cruise ship, departed Shanghai on 15 December to Sydney, arriving on New Year's Eve.

Her next cruise was from Sydney to Auckland and the South Pacific. However, mid-cruise a dispute arose between Asian Pacific Cruises and COSCO resulting in the charter being cancelled. COSCO invited an established shipping line, Burns, Philp & Co. in Sydney to continue as a joint venture partner. The resulting Five Star Shipping & Agency Co. Pty. Ltd. was the first Sino-Australian Joint Venture company established in Australia.

Burns Philp successfully organized cruises for the next 3 1/2 years under the banner "Minghua Friendship Cruises", whilst COSCO operated the ship. Most were out of Sydney and varied from short "Cruises to Nowhere" to two or three week cruises to New Zealand, the South Pacific and SE Asia and up to six week cruises to Asia, China, Japan and Hawaii. In Australia, Cairns was a frequent port of call and there were occasional visits to Adelaide, Melbourne, Brisbane, Hobart, Fremantle and Darwin, usually on the way to Asian destinations.

In July 1980 the ship sailed to Hong Kong for a major refit, the interiors were refurbished and the light green hull painted white, returning to Sydney a much improved ship. Between May and July 1981 there were a series of cruises out of Darwin to Bali, Singapore, Thailand and Hong Kong. In August 1981, she received yet another refit in Hong Kong and her capacity reduced to 450 passengers. By now she had become known by many as the "Friendship", well liked by its mostly Australian passengers for its informality.

On February 2, 1983, after a disagreement over money, the joint venture partners announced the ship would be withdrawn with the final cruise commencing May 20 to Hong Kong arriving on June 9. The announcement was unexpected and cruises already scheduled for later in the year to Hawaii and China were cancelled. During her time sailing from Australia she had completed around 70 cruises, with 17,000 passengers over the 3 1/2 years.

Whilst in Hong Kong, she operated two further cruises to Japan. These were exclusively for the Japanese market. After these were completed she was sold to become a hotel and entertainment complex in the Shekou Industrial Zone located in China on the Pearl River delta across from Hong Kong near Shenzhen, then being developed by the China Merchants Group.

== Hotel and entertainment complex (1983–present) ==
On August 17, 1983, the ship arrived in Shekou, to be refitted as a tourist attraction and part of an entertainment complex that in 1984 was named Sea World (海上世界) by Deng Xiaoping, the PRC's paramount leader, during a stay on board the Minghua. Her new features included 253 hotel rooms, Chinese and Western restaurants, an English Bar, Bamboo Grove Bar, Music Dance Hall, swimming pool, health center, children's recreation center and the China Folk Customs Exhibition Center. Even though the ship was considered a building after becoming part of Sea World, she was not removed from the Lloyd's Register until 1991.

When the ship arrived in Shekou, she was moored alongside a quay adjacent to what was to become the rest of the Sea World Complex; however, during the 1990s the area around her berth was reclaimed from the sea for a golf course and she became landlocked. The ship closed in 1998 due to management problems after a fire. Throughout the time she was closed her exterior was kept well maintained, but her interiors were badly neglected.

In December 2001 a major RMB 70M (US$8.45M) refurbishment of the ship began, completed in 2005. The complex surrounding and including the ship, now called Sea World Plaza. During the refurbishment larger windows were installed on the upper decks. The ship hosted a four-star hotel, Brazilian barbecue restaurant, numerous Western restaurants, a wine bar and cigar house, a coffee shop, boutique and movie theater.

The area around the ship was heavily damaged by floods in June 2007 which briefly surrounded the ship with water once again. In 2010 China Merchants embarked on a complete revamp of the Minghua and its surrounds. The lifeboats were removed and an ornamental lake built around the starboard side of the ship. Completed in December 2013 the ship now has a 110-room hotel, a Löwenburg Brauerei and Restaurant and a variety of other bars and restaurants, Western and Chinese. The interior of the ship and its décor is completely modern and no longer represents the interior as it was during her days afloat.

== See also ==
Ships that are berthed

- Hikawa Maru (Yokohama) - As a museum
- RMS Queen Mary (Long Beach, California, US) - As a hotel
- Queen Elizabeth 2 (Dubai) - As a hotel
