= CSG Holding =

Chinese company

CSG Holding Limited 中国南玻集团有限公司
- Company type: State-owned enterprise
- Industry: Glass
- Founded: 1984
- Founder: Yuan Geng
- Headquarters: Shenzhen, Guangdong, China
- Area served: Worldwide
- Key people: Chairman: Mr. Zeng Nan
- Website: csgholding.com

CSG Holding Limited (Chinese: 中国南玻集团有限公司) (A share: SZSE: 000012, B share: SZSE: 200012), formerly China Southern Glass Holding Limited, is the largest architectural glass manufacturer in China. It is involved in manufacturing and selling glass products, such as float glass, architectural glass, display glass, automotive glass, coated glass, mirrors, color filter glass, solar glass and conservation glass.

The company was established in 1984. Its A shares and B shares were listed on the Shenzhen Stock Exchange and this made it become one of the first listed companies in China. It is headquartered in Shenzhen and production bases are located in Shenzhen, Guangzhou, Dongguan, Tianjin, Chengdu, Yichang, Suzhou and Hainan Province.
