= Sea World (Shenzhen) =

Tourist attraction in Shenzhen, China

Coordinates: 22°29′10″N 113°54′43″E

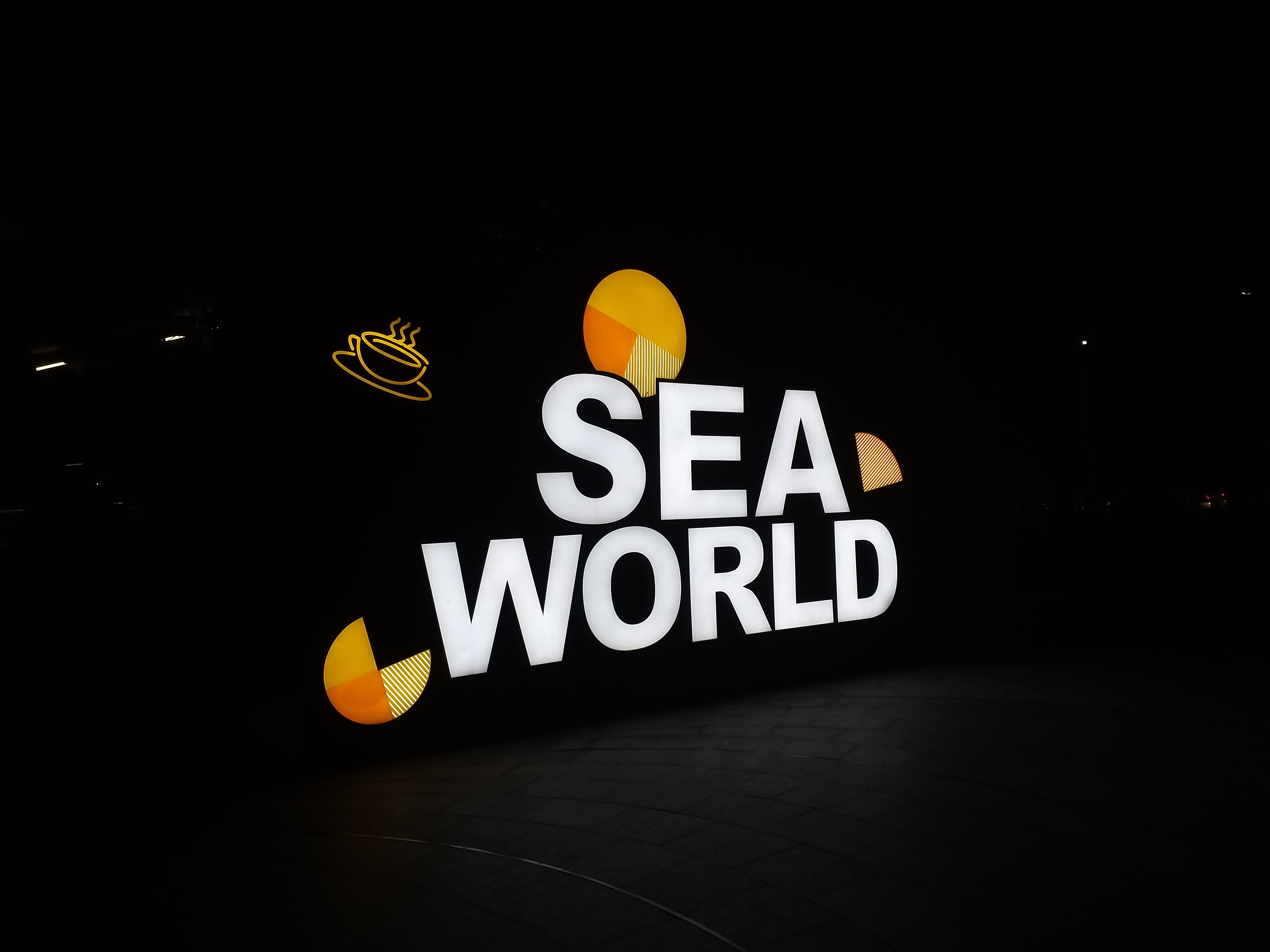
Signage in English

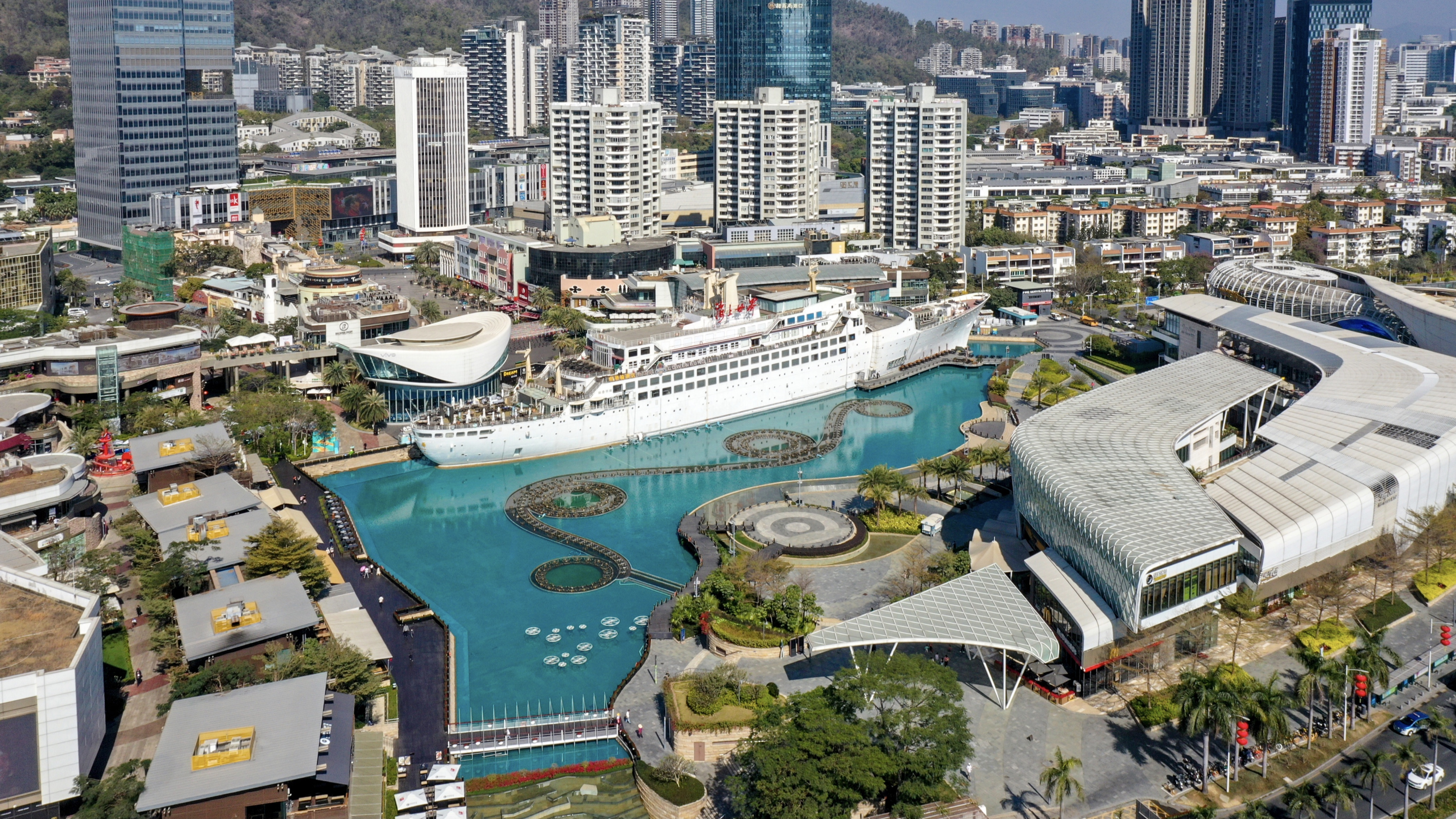
Sea World in aerial view

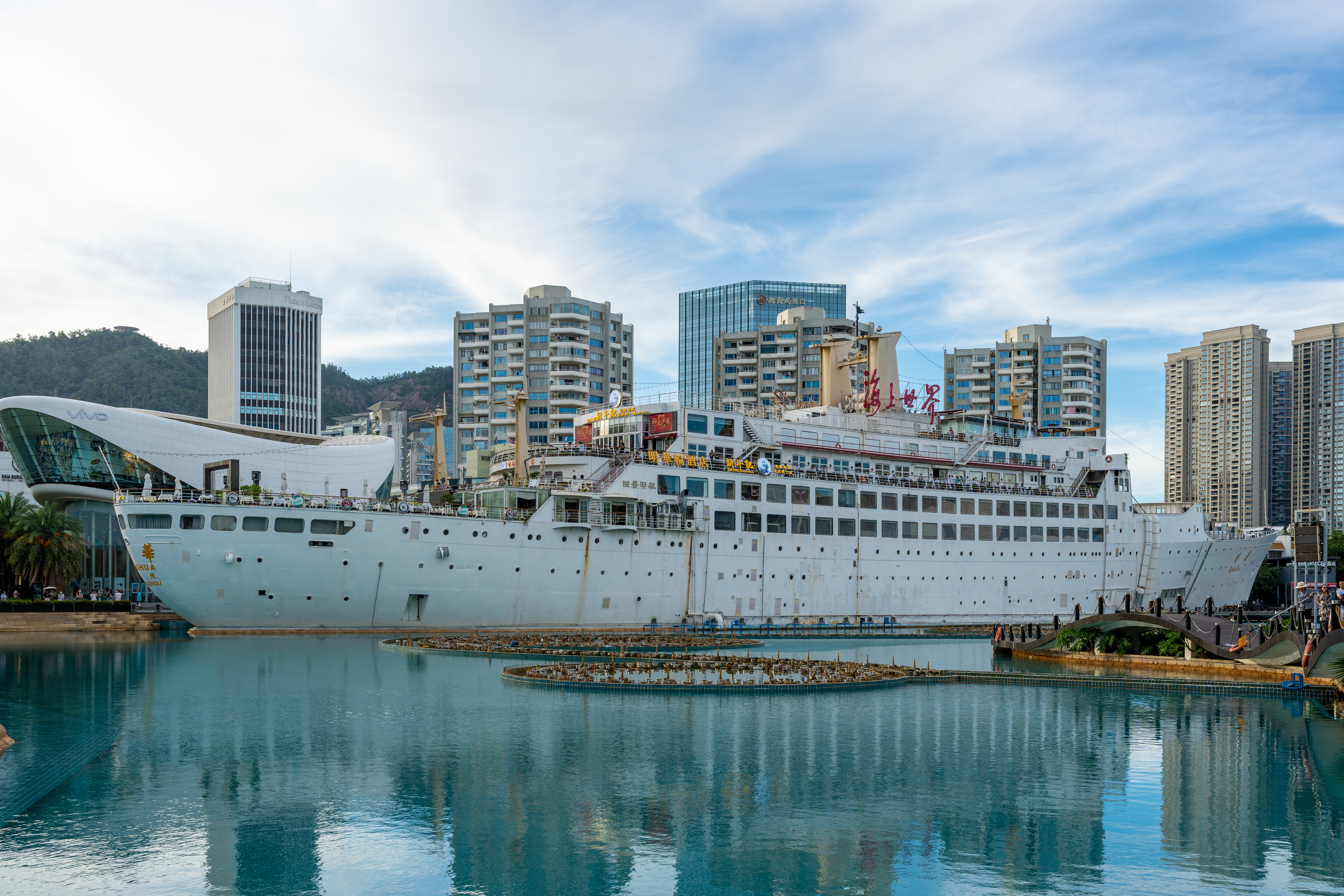
Minghua, the centerpiece of Sea World

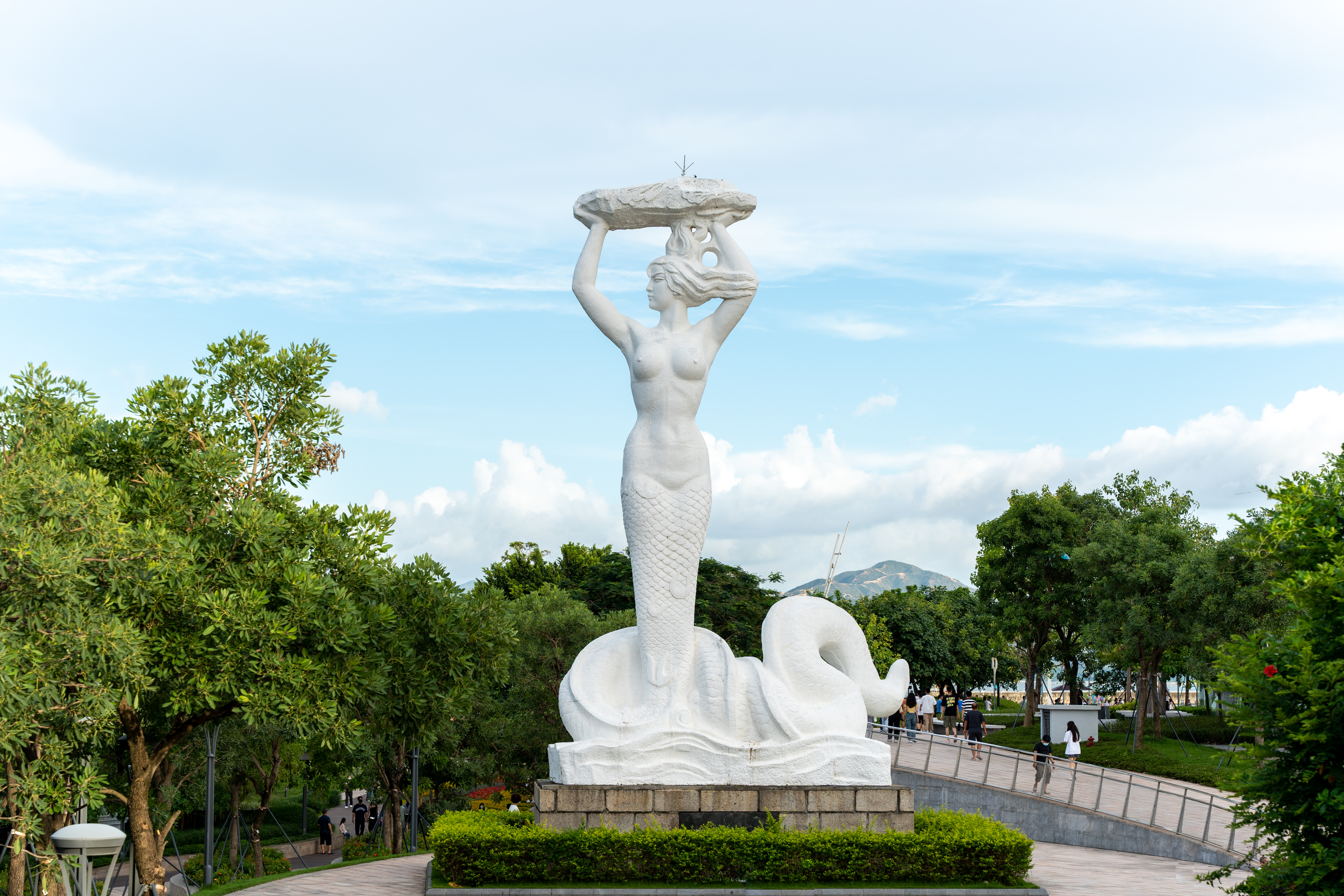
Statue of Nuwa Patching the Sky in Sea World

Sea World (Chinese: 海上世界; pinyin: Hǎishàng Shìjiè; Jyutping: hoi2 soeng6 sai3 gaai3) is a large tourist attraction and plaza in Shekou, Nanshan District, Shenzhen. Its main attraction is the large ship, Minghua, in the center of Sea World. The boat is surrounded by many shops and restaurants. This includes the Sea World Culture and Arts Center and the statue of Nuwa.

== Water show ==
During the night time, at 7 o'clock, there is a water fountain show. Music is played, with water sprayers synchronised to the music. In addition, there are lights and even fire, paid for by the Water Design Co Ltd., who invested over 30 million RMB for the project.

== Restaurants ==
Restaurants of various cuisines are in the area, numbering more than forty as of 2011. These restaurants include Allatore, Laofangzi, Tequila Coyotes, Baia Burger, as well as many other Chinese and Japanese Restaurants.

== Transportation ==
Sea World station of the Shenzhen Metro serves the area. The Line 2 station opened in 2010, putting the area on the subway system, and Line 12 services started from 2022.
