= Port of Zhuhai =

Port of Zhuhai 珠海港
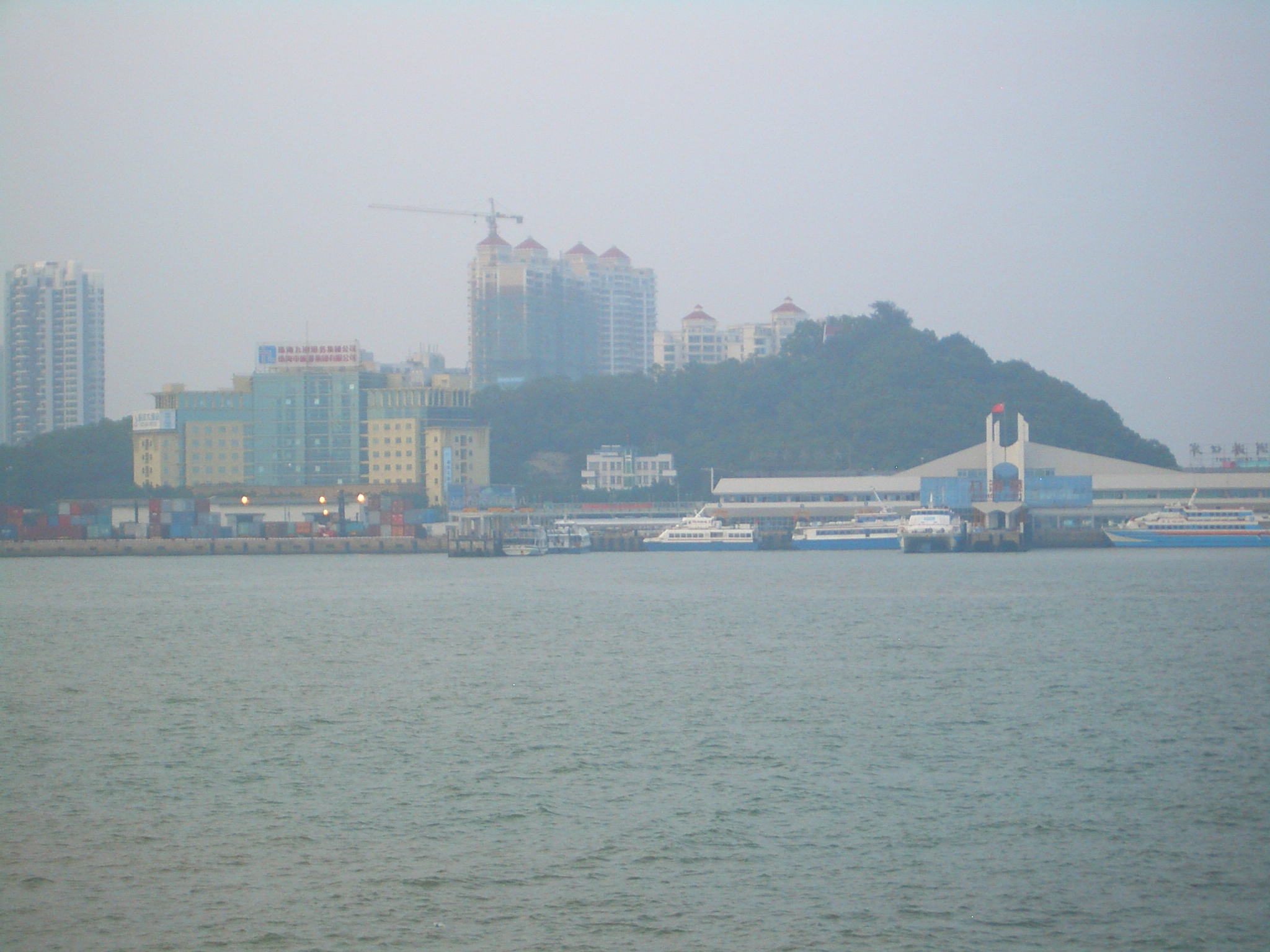
- An overall view of Jiuzhou Port

Location
- Country: People's Republic of China
- Location: Zhuhai, Guangdong Province,

Details
- Opened: 1986
- Operated by: Zhuhai Port Corporation
- Type of harbour: Natural River Seaport
- No. of berths: 131

Statistics
- Website; Port of Zhuhai website

Port of Zhuhai
- Chinese: 珠海港
- Literal meaning: Pearl Sea Port
Transcriptions
Standard Mandarin
- Hanyu Pinyin: Zhūhǎi Gǎng

The Port of Zhuhai is the port of the prefecture-level city of Zhuhai, on the west side of the Pearl River estuary in the Chinese province of Guangdong. The Port of Zhuhai is composed of seven main port areas: Gaolan, Wanshan, Jiuzhou, Xiangzhou, Tangjia, Hongwan and Doumen. The main areas are the Jiuzhou Port Area to the east of the city, and the Gaolan Port Area to the west. As of 2012, the port had 131 berths, 126 production berths, of which 17 were deep-water berths over 10,000DWT.

The Port had a total cargo throughput of 71,870,000 metric tons (70,730,000 long tons; 79,220,000 short tons) in 2012, and surpassed the 100,000,000 t (98,000,000 long tons; 110,000,000 short tons) mark in 2013.

The volume of port traffic and urban population make Zhuhai a medium-port metropolis according to the Southampton system of port-city classification.

The Jiujiang Port Area includes a container terminal and a terminal for high-speed ferries connecting Zhuhai with Shenzhen in mainland China and Hong Kong. It is also developing into a transport hub with regular coach services connecting the port with various cities west of the Pearl River such as Jiangmen and Shunde.

Ticketed passengers on flights going to and from Hong Kong International Airport may take ferries from the Zhuhai Ferry Terminal to the HKIA Skypier.

== History and Geography ==
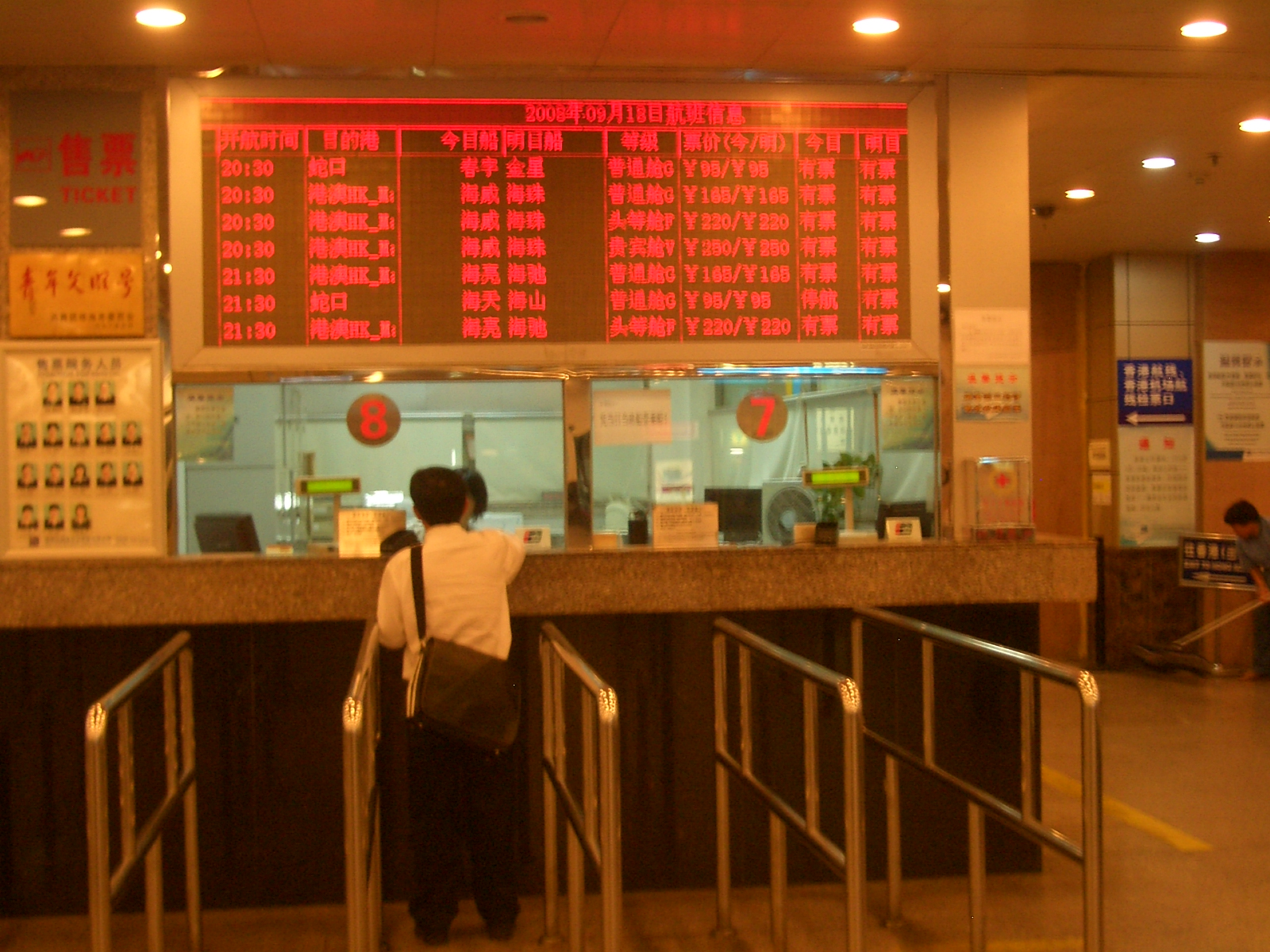
Ticketing counter

Zhuhai International Container Terminals (Jiuzhou), ZICT(J), located in the city of Zhuhai on the western bank of the Pearl River Delta (PRD) in the Guangdong Province, adjacent to Macau and 36 nautical miles (67 km) from Hong Kong, commenced operations in 1993. Providing container and general cargo handling services, ZICT(J) operates five multi-purpose berths.

On 10 July 2007, a new ferry service between Jiuzhou port and Skypier in Hong Kong International Airport began. The new service was to have two roundtrip sailings per day and can carry 1,300 passengers, with ferries departing Jiuzhou at 9:30 am and 3:30 pm and leaving the airport at 11:15 am and 5 pm. There were plant to increase frequency to three roundtrip sailings daily by August and four daily by January 2008.

In Spring 2009, refurbishment of the port was completed, with new stores and other facilities for passengers.

== Ferry timetable ==
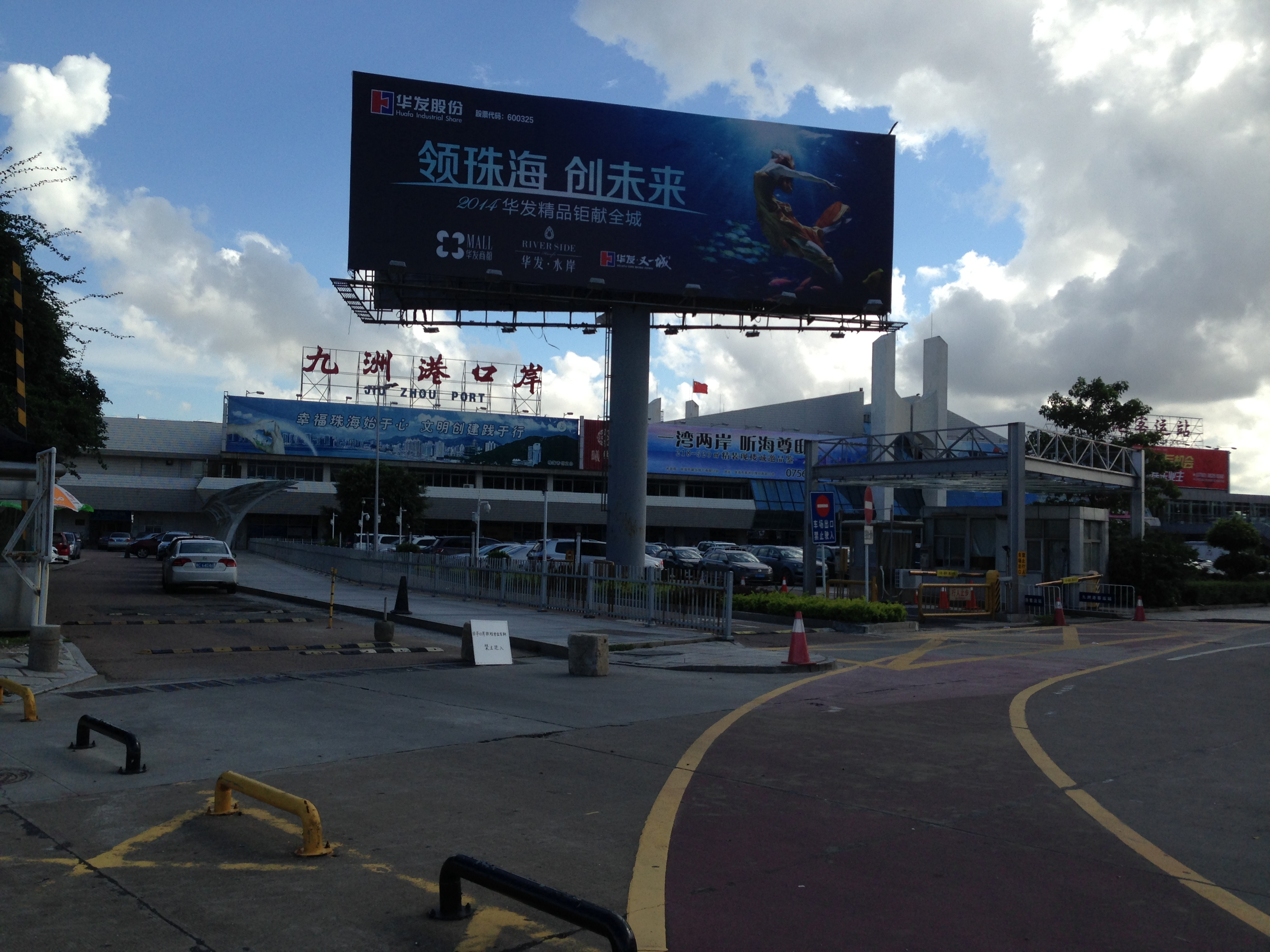
Passenger terminal at Jiuzhou Port

=== Hong Kong China Ferry Terminal ===
Time	Depart	Arrive
07:30	Hong Kong China Ferry Terminal	Jiuzhou Port
08:00	Jiuzhou Port	Hong Kong China Ferry Terminal
08:30	Hong Kong China Ferry Terminal	Jiuzhou Port
09:30	Hong Kong China Ferry Terminal	Jiuzhou Port
10:00	Jiuzhou Port	Hong Kong China Ferry Terminal
11:30	Hong Kong China Ferry Terminal	Jiuzhou Port
12:00	Jiuzhou Port	Hong Kong China Ferry Terminal
13:30	Hong Kong China Ferry Terminal	Jiuzhou Port
14:00	Jiuzhou Port	Hong Kong China Ferry Terminal
15:30	Hong Kong China Ferry Terminal	Jiuzhou Port
16:00	Jiuzhou Port	Hong Kong China Ferry Terminal
17:00	Jiuzhou Port	Hong Kong China Ferry Terminal
17:30	Jiuzhou Port	Hong Kong China Ferry Terminal
17:30	Hong Kong China Ferry Terminal	Jiuzhou Port
19:00	Hong Kong China Ferry Terminal	Jiuzhou Port

Source: CKSP company website

=== Hong Kong Macau Ferry Terminal ===
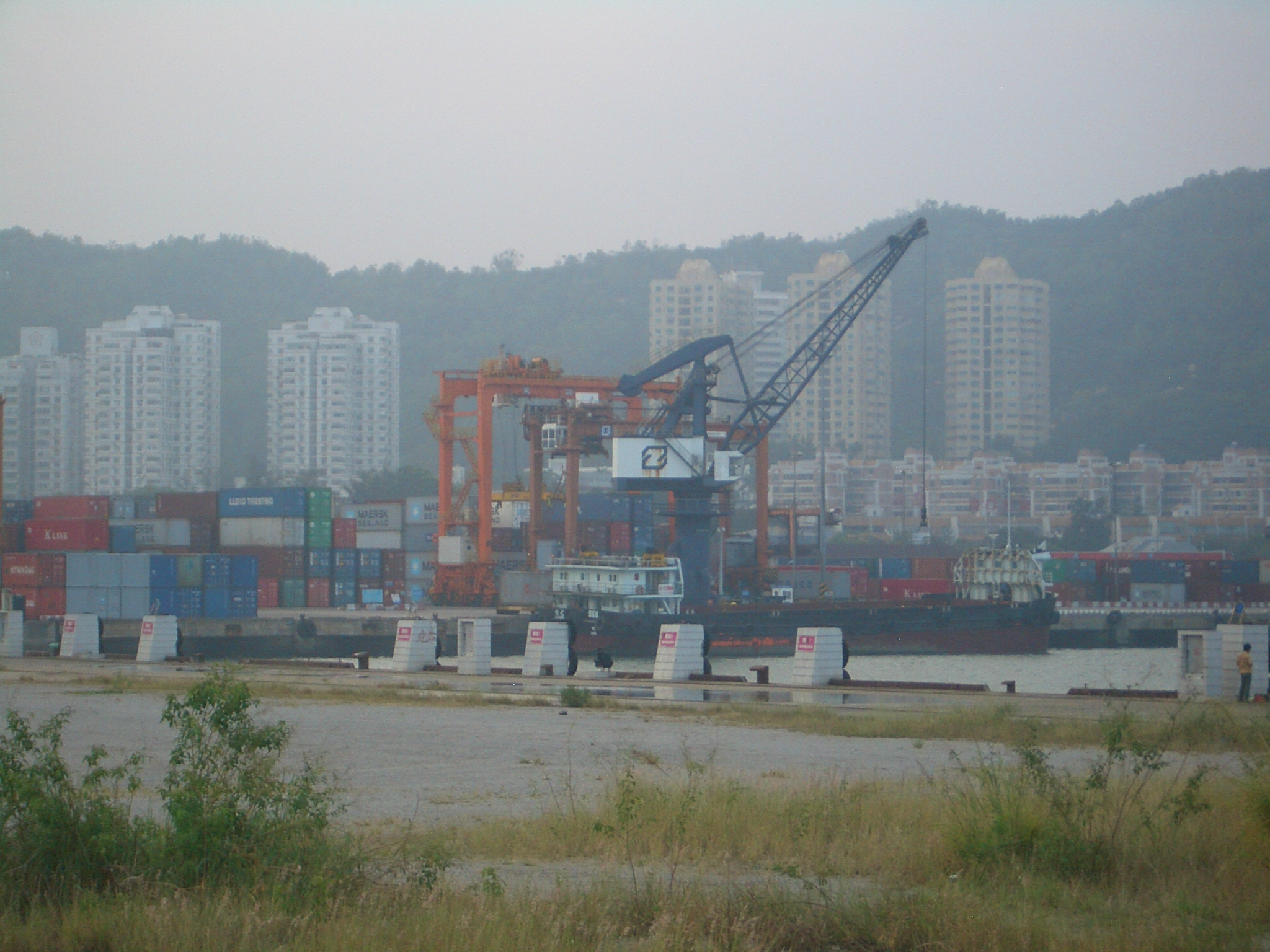
Container handling facility

Time	Depart	Arrive
08:40	Hong Kong Macau Ferry Terminal	Jiuzhou Port
09:00	Jiuzhou Port	Hong Kong Macau Ferry Terminal
10:30	Hong Kong Macau Ferry Terminal	Jiuzhou Port
11:00	Jiuzhou Port	Hong Kong Macau Ferry Terminal
12:30	Hong Kong Macau Ferry Terminal	Jiuzhou Port
13:00	Jiuzhou Port	Hong Kong Macau Ferry Terminal
14;30	Hong Kong Macau Ferry Terminal	Jiuzhou Port
15:00	Jiuzhou Port	Hong Kong Macau Ferry Terminal
16:30	Hong Kong Macau Ferry Terminal	Jiuzhou Port
18:00	Jiuzhou Port	Hong Kong Macau Ferry Terminal
19:30	Jiuzhou Port	Hong Kong Macau Ferry Terminal
19:30	Hong Kong Macau Ferry Terminal	Jiuzhou Port
20:30	Jiuzhou Port	Hong Kong Macau Ferry Terminal
21:30	Jiuzhou Port	Hong Kong Macau Ferry Terminal
21:30	Hong Kong Macau Ferry Terminal	Jiuzhou Port

Source: CKSP website

=== Hong Kong International Airport ===
Time	Depart	Arrive
9:30	Jiuzhou Port	Hong Kong International Airport
12:15	Hong Kong International Airport	Jiuzhou Port
12:40	Jiuzhou Port	Hong Kong International Airport
14:05	Hong Kong International Airport	Jiuzhou Port
15:30	Jiuzhou Port	Hong Kong International Airport
17:00	Hong Kong International Airport	Jiuzhou Port
18:30	Jiuzhou Port	Hong Kong International Airport
20:00	Hong Kong International Airport	Jiuzhou Port

Source: CKSP company website

== Forward travel from Jiuzhou Port ==
Jiuzhou Port is connected by a number of other on-going transport options.

Taxis are available.

After a busy ferry has come in, it might be necessary to queue and wait for taxis to return. To the right of the port on the sea wall-lined pavement is a bus stop for buses headed north. The number 99 directly passes the famous "Fisher Girl" statue (symbol of Zhuhai), and has views of the surrounding islands.

Opposite the port is a larger bus terminus where a number of buses run regular services. From here the number 3 restarts its route and heads North past Zhongshan University and Beijing Normal University, Zhuhai Campus, all the way up to Jin Ding. Many other bus routes lead down into the Gongbei (Chinese: 拱北; pinyin: Gǒngběi) section of Zhuhai, where the China / Macau Border Crossing is located.

== See also ==
- Chu Kong Passenger Transport Co., Ltd
