= Humen Ferry Terminal =

Ferry terminal in Dongguan, China

Humen Ferry Terminal (虎门港澳码头) (IATA: ZTI) is a ferry terminal in the Humen Town of Dongguan, in the Southern China's Guangdong province, situated immediately north of Hong Kong. It includes a passenger terminal for high-speed ferries connecting the Humen with Zhuhai and the Skypier at Hong Kong International Airport.

== See also ==
- Chu Kong Passenger Transport Co., Ltd
- Pearl River
