= Huaide station =

Shenzhen Metro Line 12 station

Huaide 怀德
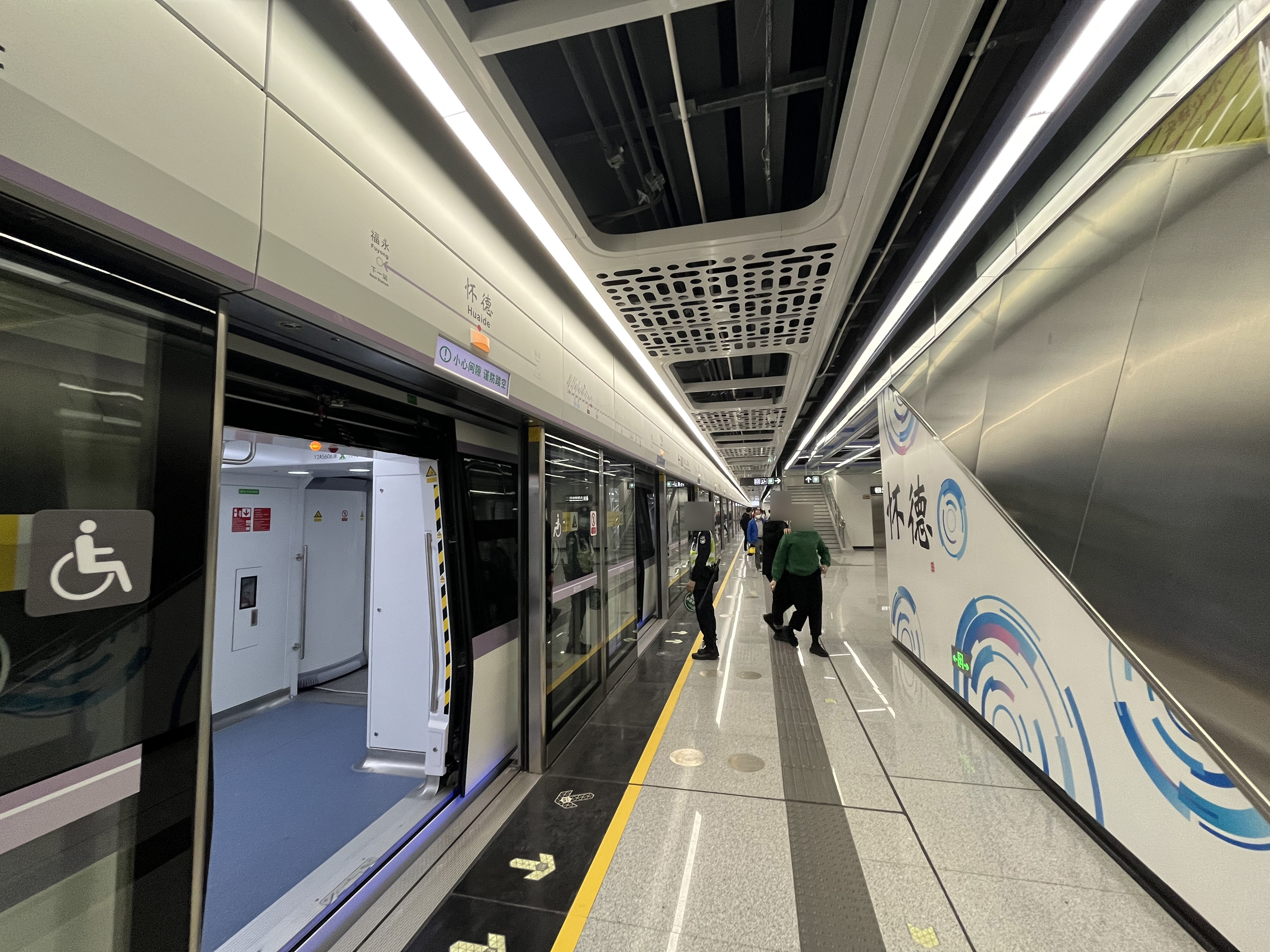
- Platform

Chinese name
- Traditional Chinese: 懷德
- Simplified Chinese: 怀德
Transcriptions
Standard Mandarin
- Hanyu Pinyin: Huáidé
Yue: Cantonese
- Yale Romanization: Waaidāk
- Jyutping: Waai3 Dak1

General information
- Location: South of the intersection of Huaide South Road and Fuyong Avenue; Fuyong Subdistrict, Bao'an District, Shenzhen, Guangdong; China
- Coordinates: 22°40′9.80″N 113°48′50.58″E
- Operator: Shenzhen Line 12 Rail Transit Co., Ltd (Shenzhen Metro Group and PowerChina PPP)
- Line: Line 12
- Platforms: 2 (1 island platform)
- Tracks: 2

Construction
- Structure type: Underground
- Accessible: Yes

History
- Opened: 28 November 2022 (3 years ago)

Services
Preceding station	Shenzhen Metro	Following station
Fuyong towards Songgang	Line 12	Fuwei towards Zuopaotai East
Location

Huaide station (simplified Chinese: 怀德站; traditional Chinese: 懷德站; pinyin: Huáidé Zhàn; Cantonese Yale: Waaidāk Jaahm) is a metro station on Line 12 of Shenzhen Metro. It opened on 28 November 2022.

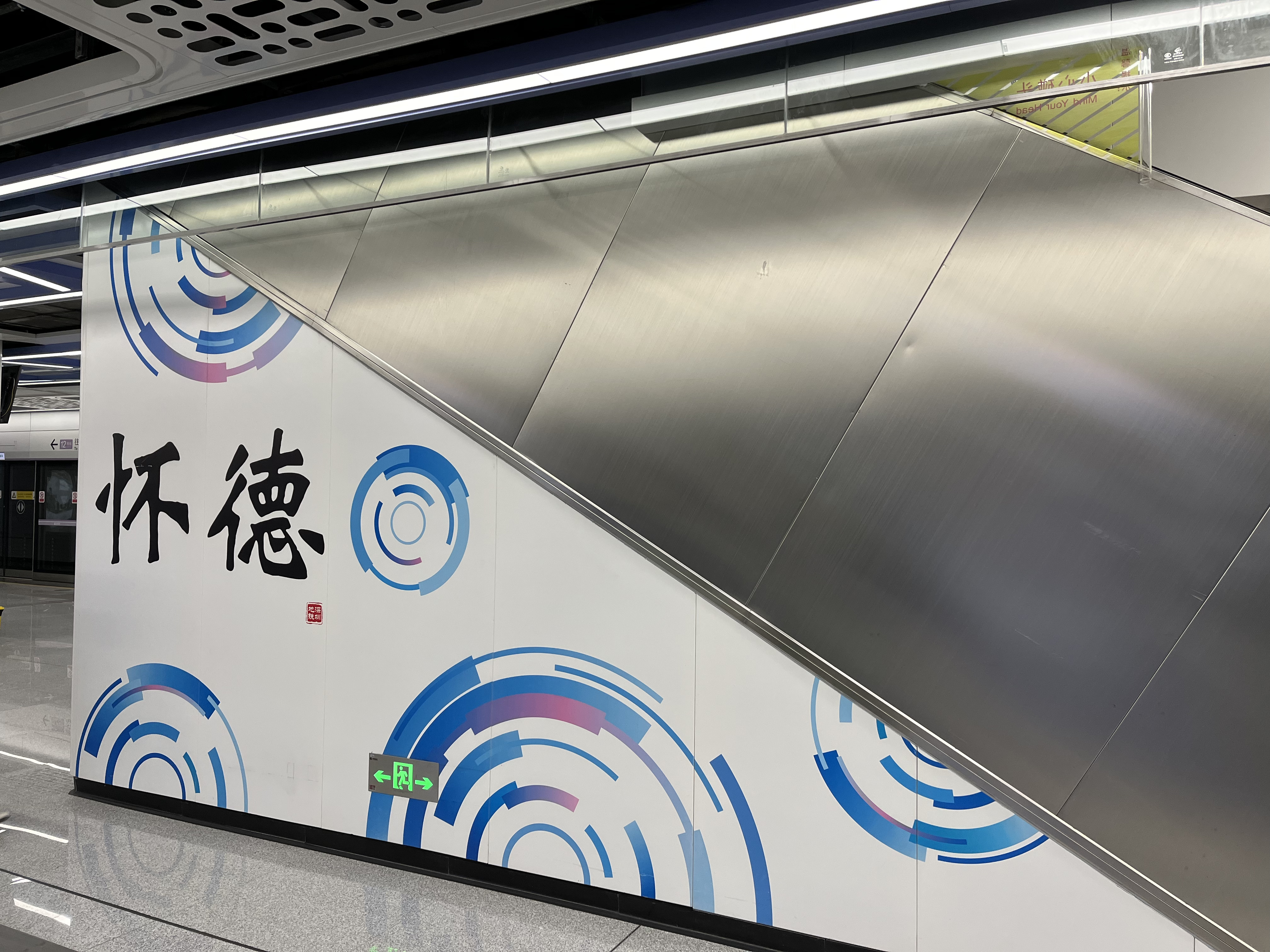
Calligraphy

== Station layout ==
The station has an island platform under Huaide South Road.

G	–	Exits A-D
B1F; Concourse	Lobby	Ticket Machines, Customer Service, Station Control Room
B2F; Platforms	Platform	12 towards Songgang (Fuyong)
B2F; Platforms	Island platform, doors will open on the left
B2F; Platforms	Platform	12 towards Zuopaotai East (Fuwei)

=== Entrances/exits ===
The station has 5 points of entry/exit, with Exits A and C being accessible via elevators. Exit C has a toilet.

Exit		Destination
Exit A		Huaide South Road (E), Cuigang West Road (N)
Exit B	B1	Huaide South Road (E), Fuyong Boulevard (S)
Exit B	B2	Unopened
Exit C		Huaide South Road (W), Fuyong Boulevard (S)
Exit D		Huaide South Road (W), Cuigang West Road (N)

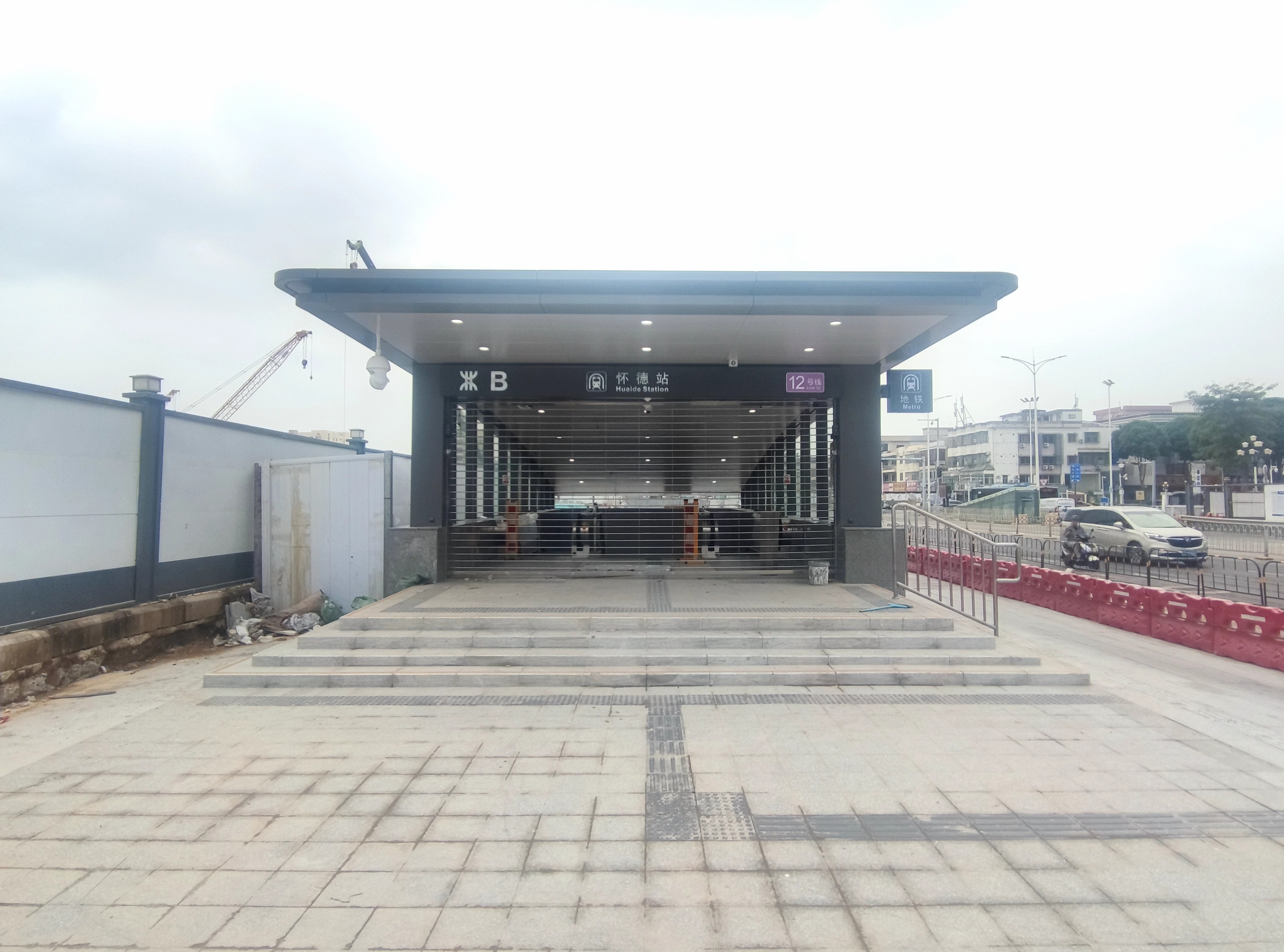
Entrance B

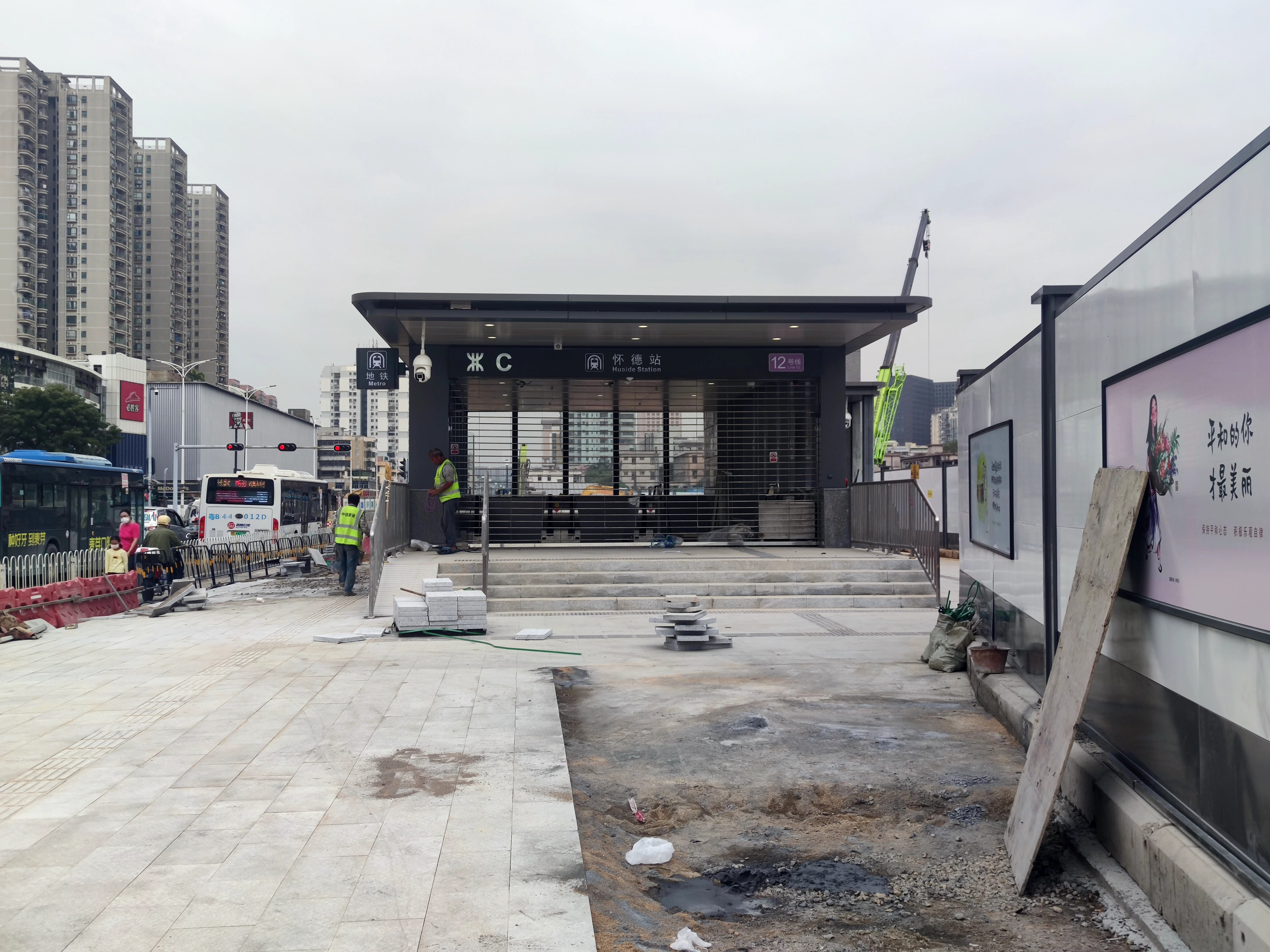
Entrance C
