= Fuwei station =

Shenzhen Metro Line 12 station

Fuwei 福围
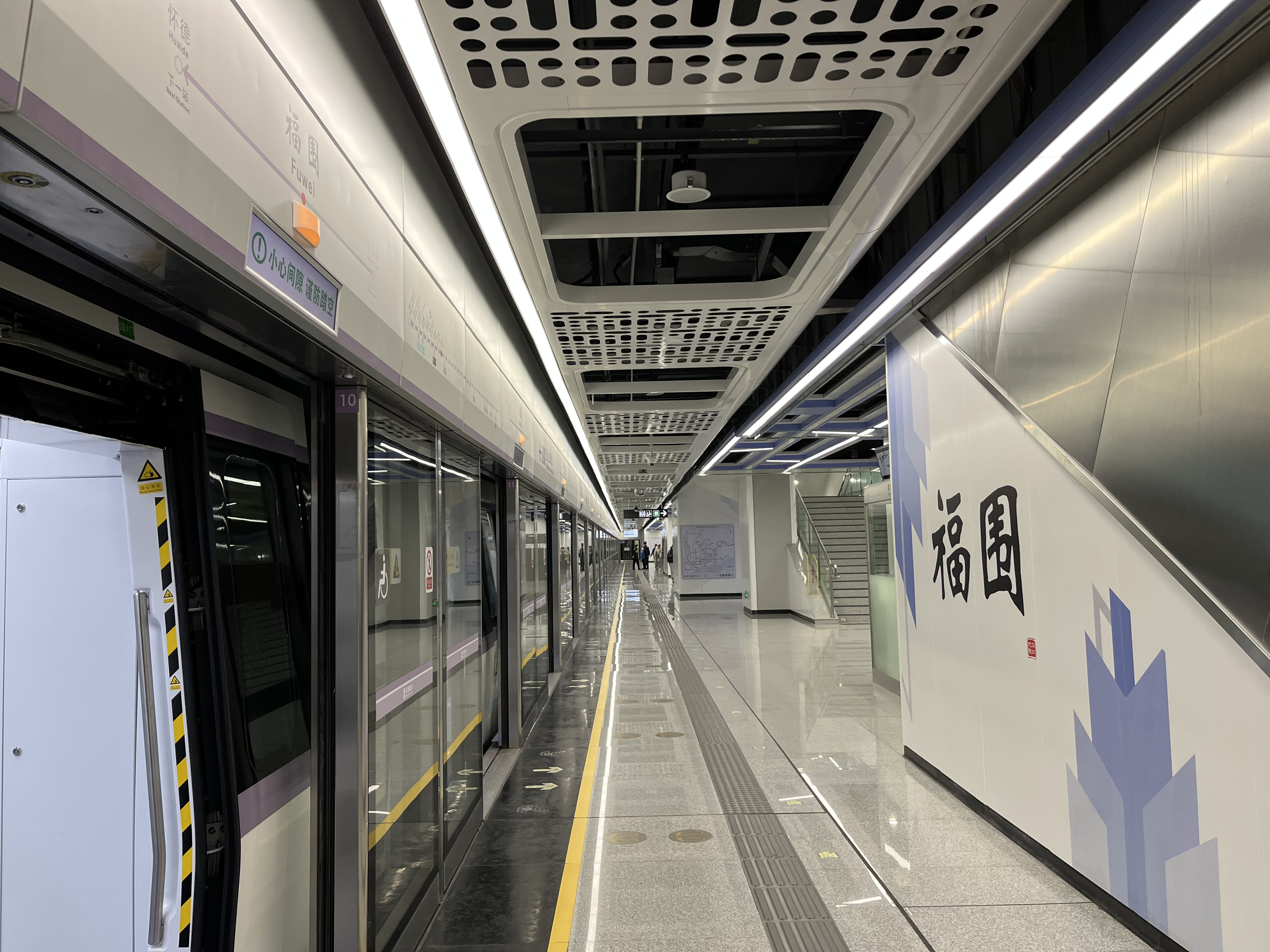
- Platform

Chinese name
- Traditional Chinese: 福圍
- Simplified Chinese: 福围
Transcriptions
Standard Mandarin
- Hanyu Pinyin: Fúwéi
Yue: Cantonese
- Yale Romanization: Fūkwài
- Jyutping: Fuk1 Wai4

General information
- Location: Intersection of Xiashiwei Road and Lixin South Road; Fuyong Subdistrict, Bao'an District, Shenzhen, Guangdong; China
- Coordinates: 22°39′35.39″N 113°48′59.04″E
- Operator: Shenzhen Line 12 Rail Transit Co., Ltd (Shenzhen Metro Group and PowerChina PPP)
- Line: Line 12
- Platforms: 2 (1 island platform)
- Tracks: 2

Construction
- Structure type: Underground
- Accessible: Yes

History
- Opened: 28 November 2022 (3 years ago)
- Former names: Cuigang Industrial Park (翠岗工业园)

Services
Preceding station	Shenzhen Metro	Following station
Huaide towards Songgang	Line 12	Airport East towards Zuopaotai East
Location

Fuwei station (simplified Chinese: 福围站; traditional Chinese: 福圍站; pinyin: Fúwéi Zhàn; Cantonese Yale: Fūkwài Jaahm) is a metro station on Line 12 of Shenzhen Metro. It opened on 28 November 2022.

== Station layout ==
The station has an island platform under Xiashiwei Road.

G	–	Exits A-C
B1F; Concourse	Lobby	Ticket Machines, Customer Service, Station Control Room
B2F; Platforms	Platform	12 towards Songgang (Huaide)
B2F; Platforms	Island platform, doors will open on the left
B2F; Platforms	Platform	12 towards Zuopaotai East (Airport East)

=== Entrances/exits ===
The station has 4 points of entry/exit, with Exit A being accessible via elevator. Exit C has a toilet.

Exit		Destination
Exit A		Xiashiwei Road (S), Fuwei Estate
Exit B	B1	Xiashiwei Road (S)
Exit B	B2	Xiashiwei Road (S)
Exit C		Xiashiwei Road (N), Lixin South Road (W), Xin'an Elementary School

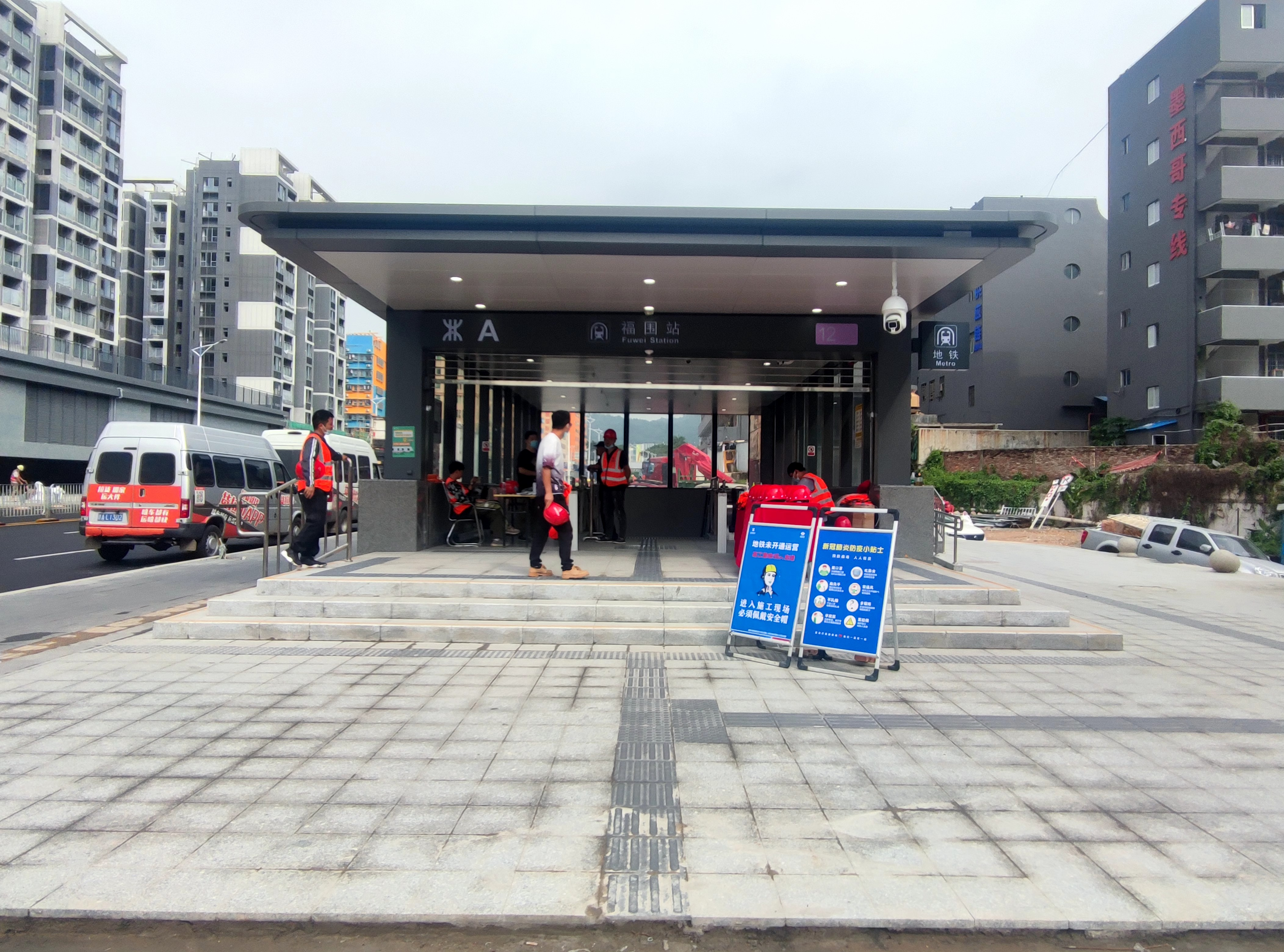
Entrance A

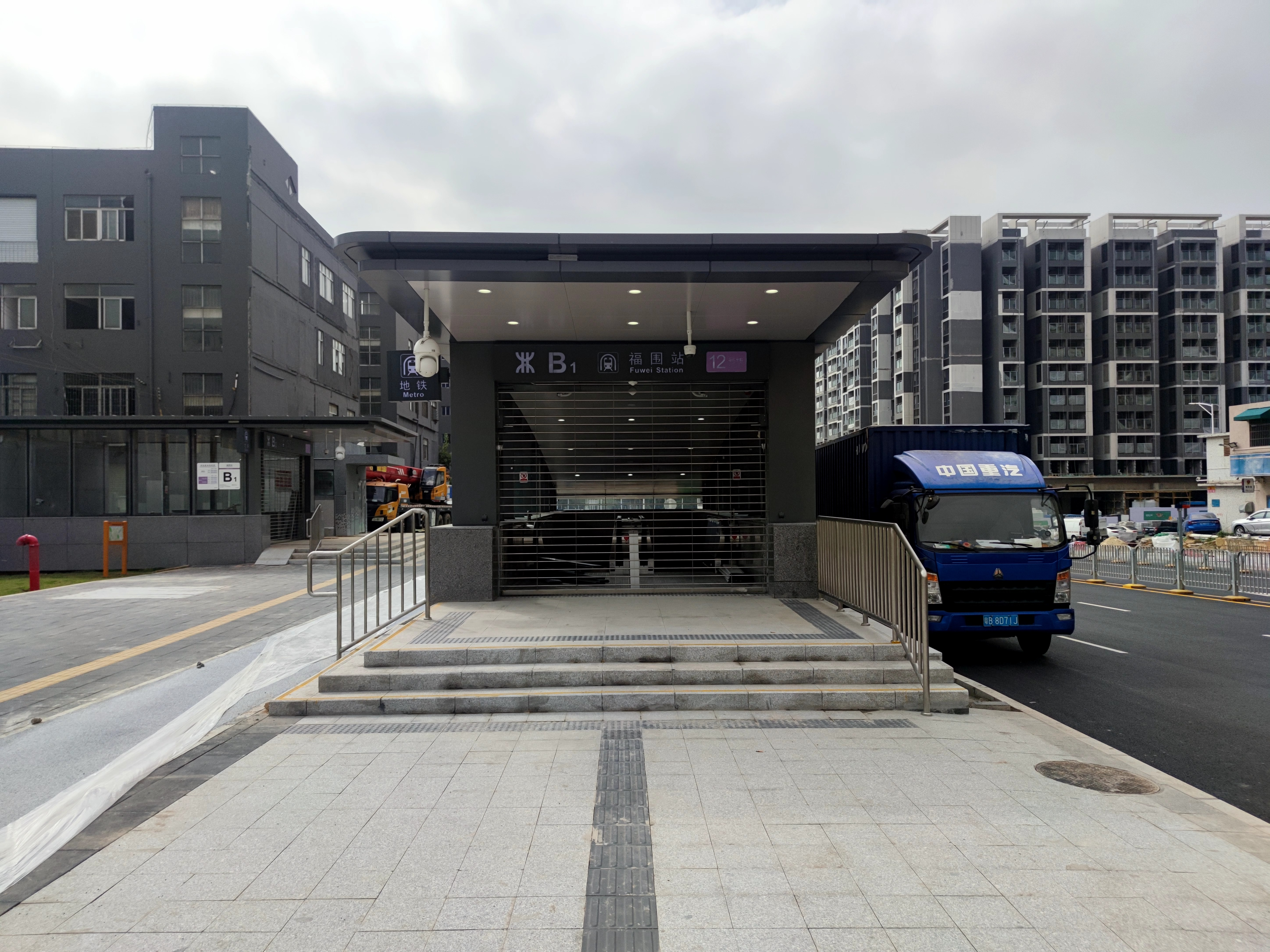
Entrance B1

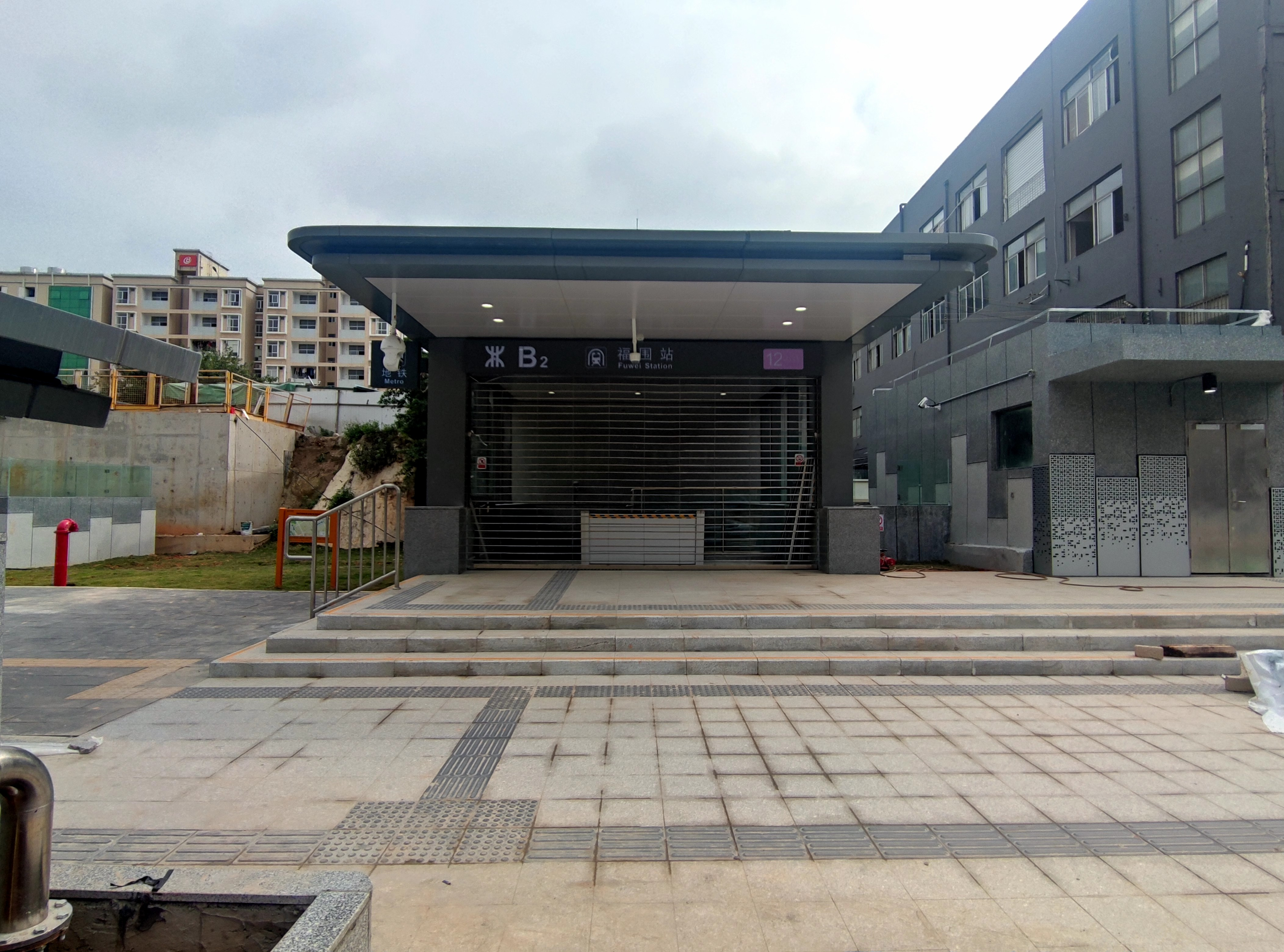
Entrance B2

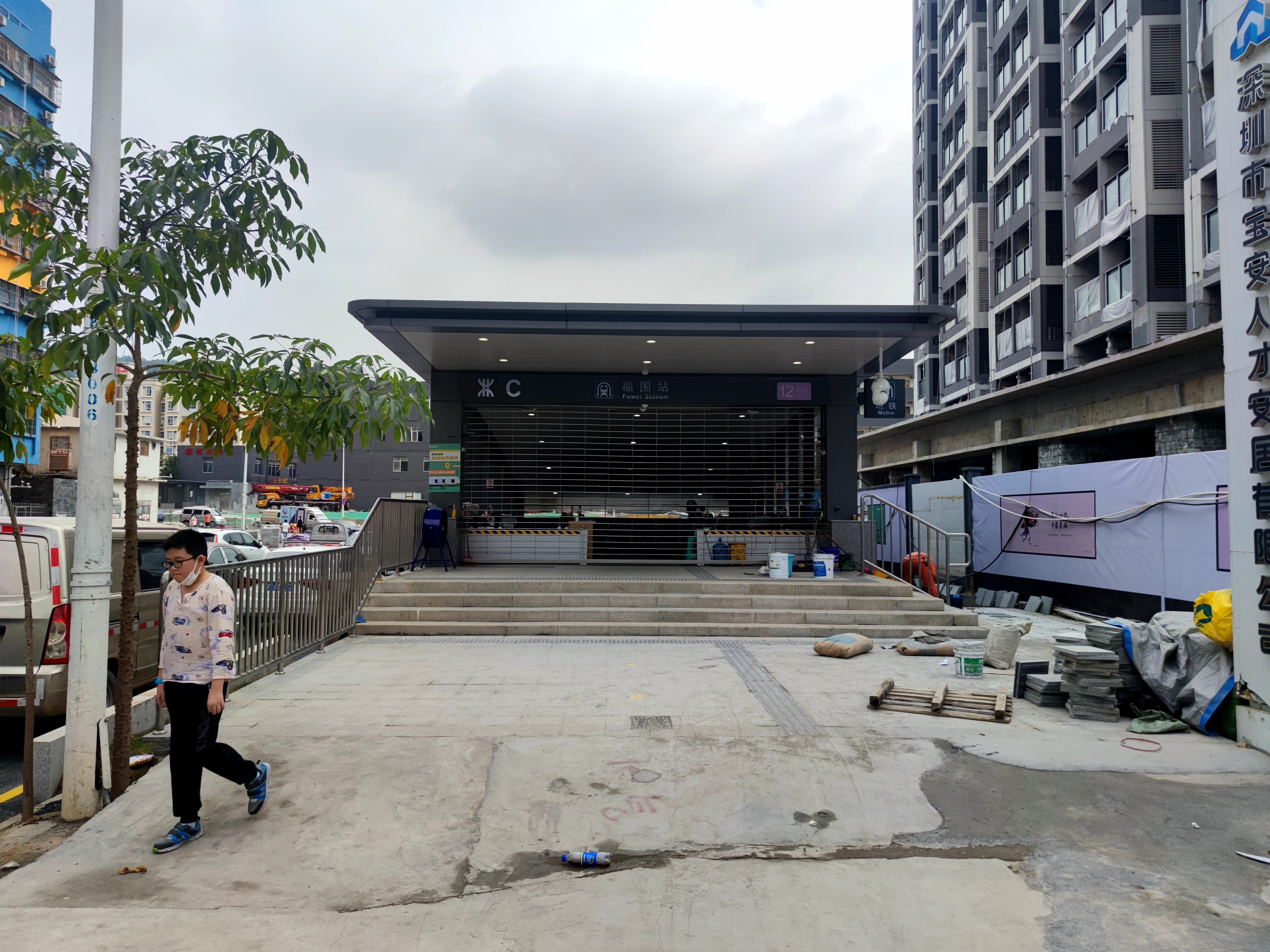
Entrance C
