= Chu Kong Passenger Transport =

Pearl River Delta ferry operator

IATA	ICAO	Call sign
3A	—	—
- Founded: 1985
- Commenced operations: 1985
- Hubs: Hong Kong International Airport (Skypier)
- Fleet size: 27
- Destinations: 9 (routes to/from Hong Kong International Airport only)
- Parent company: Chu Kong Shipping Enterprises (Group) Company Limited
- Headquarters: Central, Hong Kong
- Website: cksp.com.hk

Chu Kong Passenger Transport Co., Ltd.
- Traditional Chinese: 珠江客運有限公司
- Simplified Chinese: 珠江客运有限公司
- Literal meaning: Pearl River Transport Co., Ltd.
Transcriptions
Standard Mandarin
- Hanyu Pinyin: Zhūjiāng Kèyùn Yǒuxiàngōngsī
Yue: Cantonese
- Jyutping: zyu1 gong1 haak3 wan6 jau5 haan6 gung1 si1

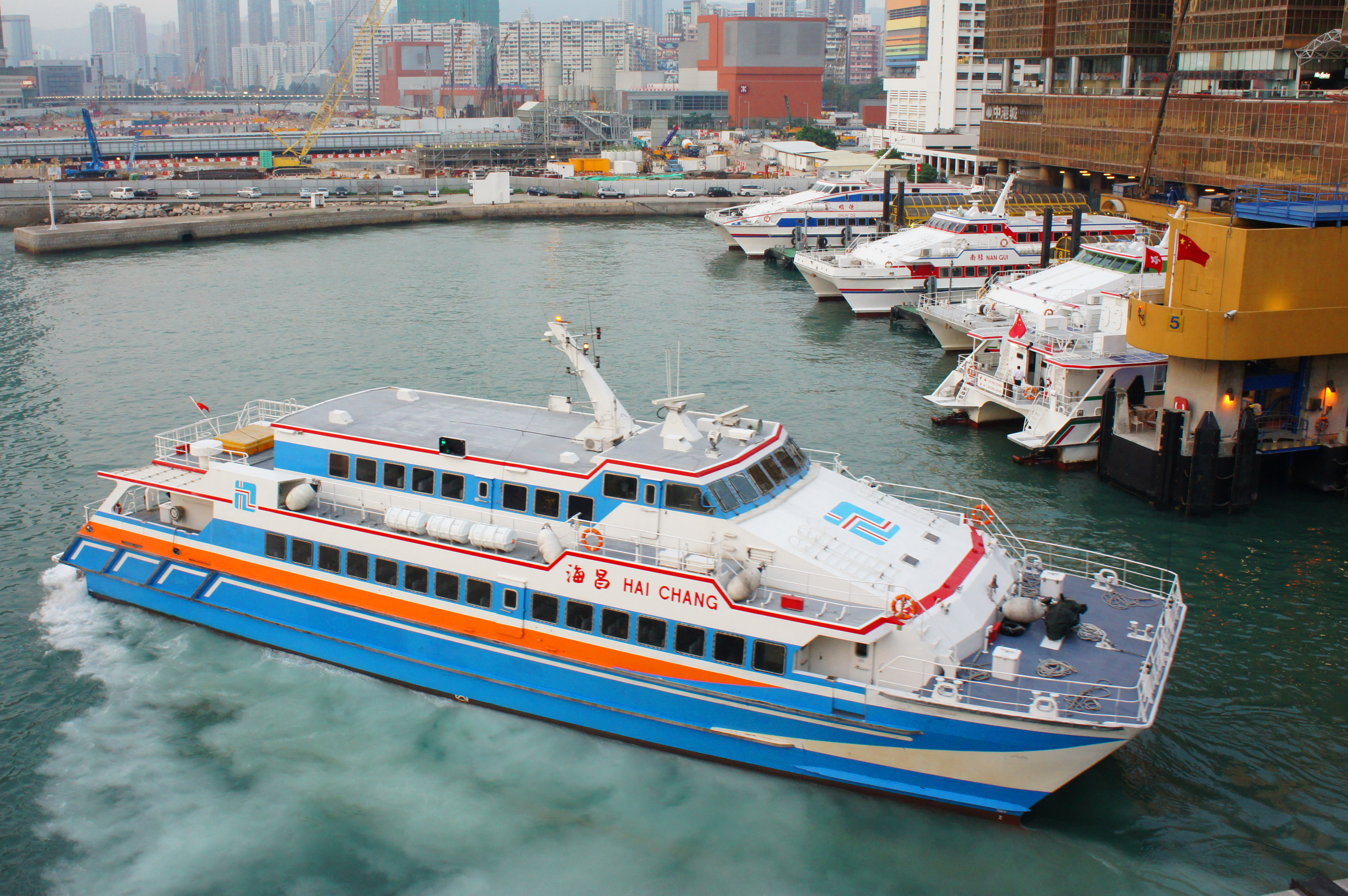
Hai Chang catamaran at Hong Kong China Ferry Terminal

Chu Kong Passenger Transport Co., Ltd. (CKPT; traditional Chinese: 珠江客運; simplified Chinese: 珠江客运) is a subsidiary of Chu Kong Shipping Enterprises (CKS) and operates ferry services between Hong Kong and cities in Guangdong province, China, as well as Macau.

It is headquartered in the Chu Kong Shipping Tower (珠江船務大廈) in Central, Hong Kong.

CKS has been assigned the two-letter airline code 3A by IATA, used for routes to/from Hong Kong International Airport only, where passengers must continue to other destinations (or vice versa) by air.

== History ==
The company was established in Hong Kong in July 1985 and is the subsidiary of Hong Kong Chu Kong Shipping Enterprises (Holdings) Company Limited.

== Routes and ports ==
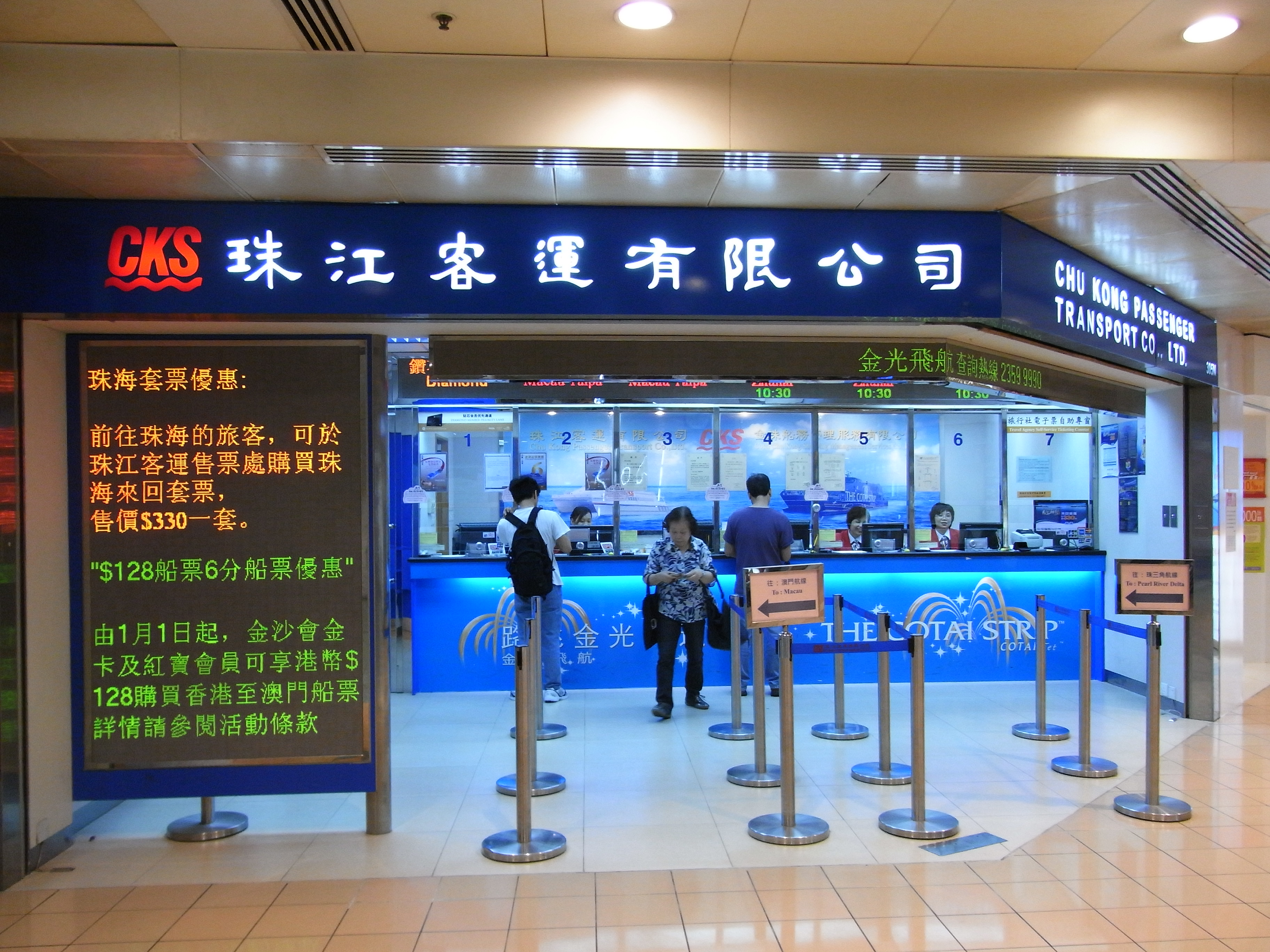
CKS counter within the Shun Tak Centre

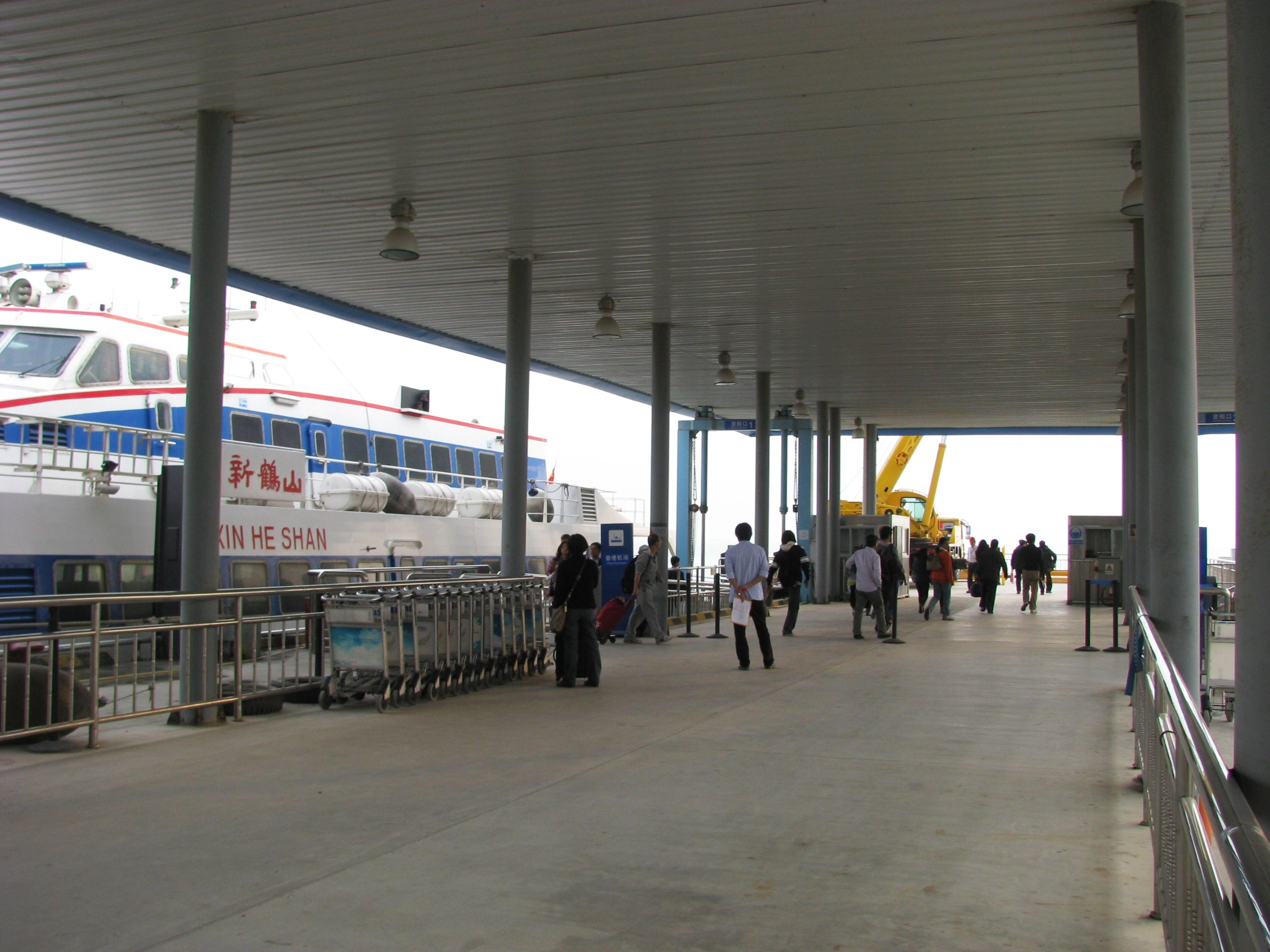
Xin He Shan catamaran at Fuyong Pier

Terminals in Hong Kong:

- Hong Kong China Ferry Terminal (中港城碼頭)
- Hong Kong–Macau Ferry Terminal (港澳碼頭)
- Skypier at Hong Kong International Airport (海天碼頭)

Ports and terminals have full customs and immigration desks, as well as ticket offices. The ports served by CKS outside of Hong Kong include:

- Macau:
  - Outer Harbour Ferry Terminal
  - Taipa Temporary Ferry Terminal
- Doumen (斗門), Zhuhai
- Fuyong next to Shenzhen Bao'an International Airport - Fuyong Ferry Terminal
- Gaoming (高明), Foshan
- Gongyi, Taishan (台山公益)
- Heshan (鶴山), Jiangmen
- Humen (虎門), Dongguan - Humen Ferry Terminal
- Jiangmen (江門)
- Lianhuashan, Panyu (番禺蓮花山), Guangzhou
- Nanhai, Foshan
- Sanbu, Kaiping (開平三埠), Jiangmen
- Shekou (蛇口), Shenzhen - Shekou Cruise Center
- Shunde (順德), Foshan - Shunde Port
- Xinhui, Jiangmen
- Xintang, Zengcheng, Guangzhou
- Zhaoqing. Transfer by bus at the port in Gaoming
- Zhongshan (中山)
- Jiuzhou Port, Zhuhai (珠海九洲港)

== Fleet ==
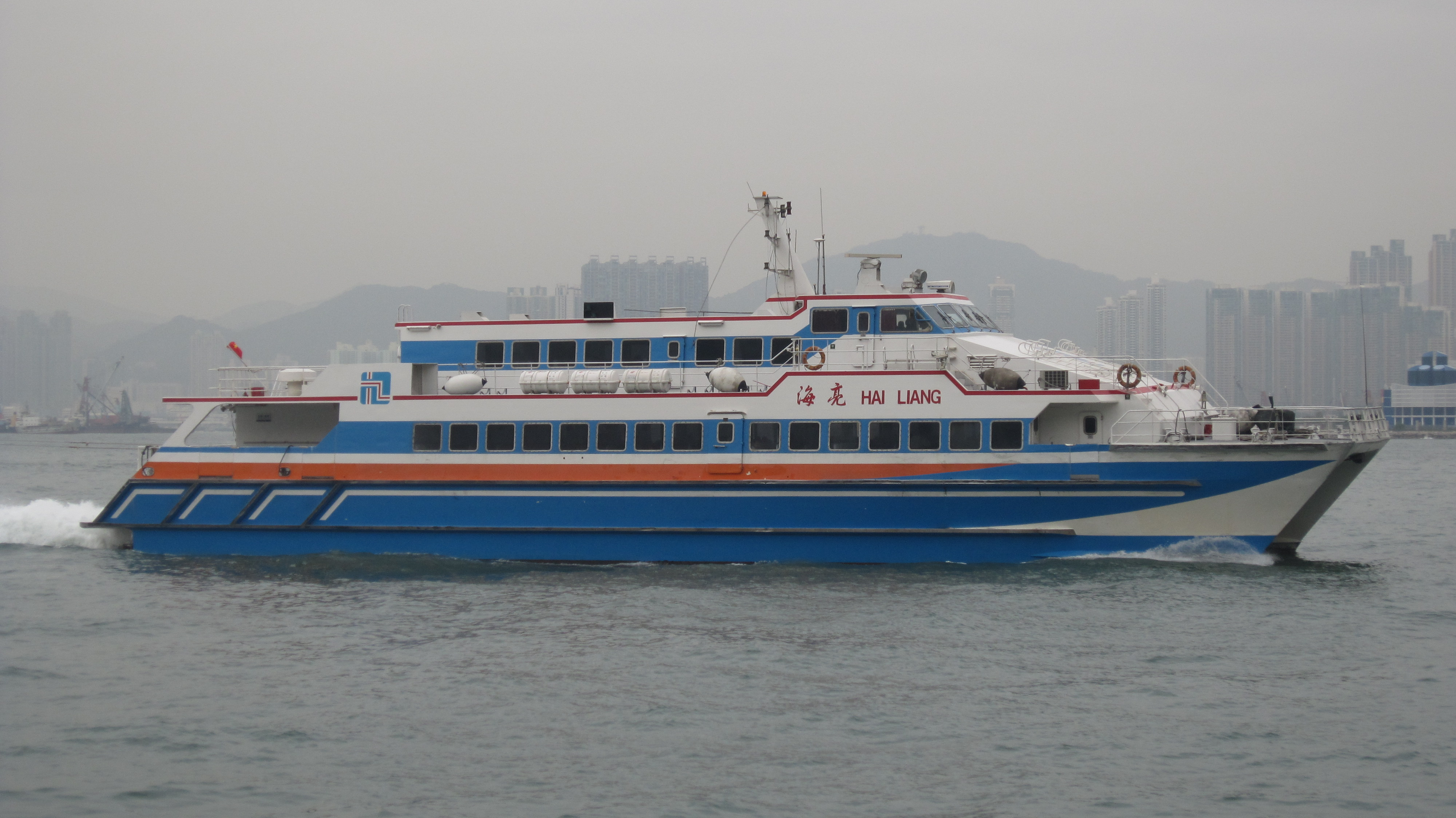
Hai Liang catamaran

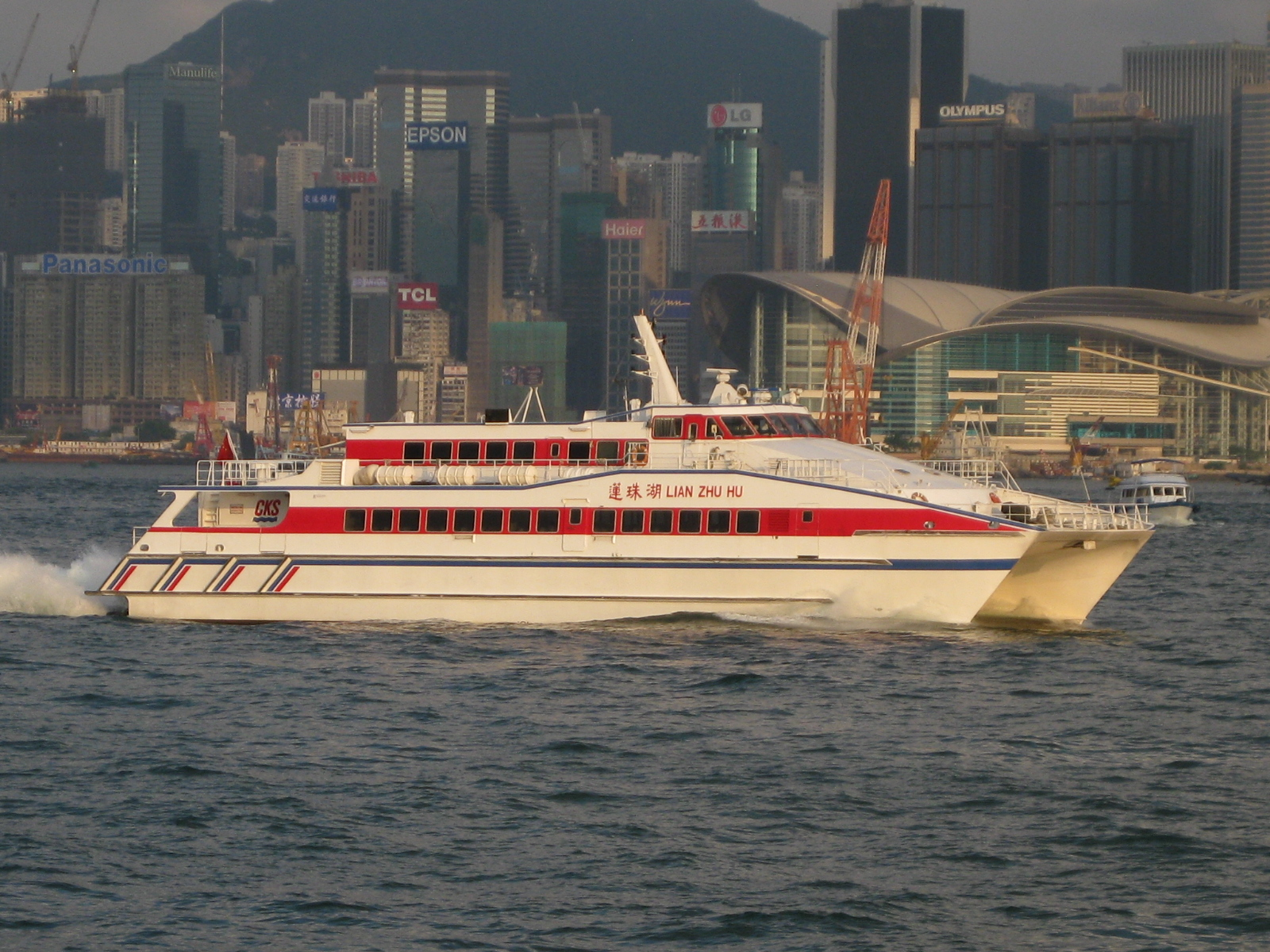
Lian Zhu Hu catamaran

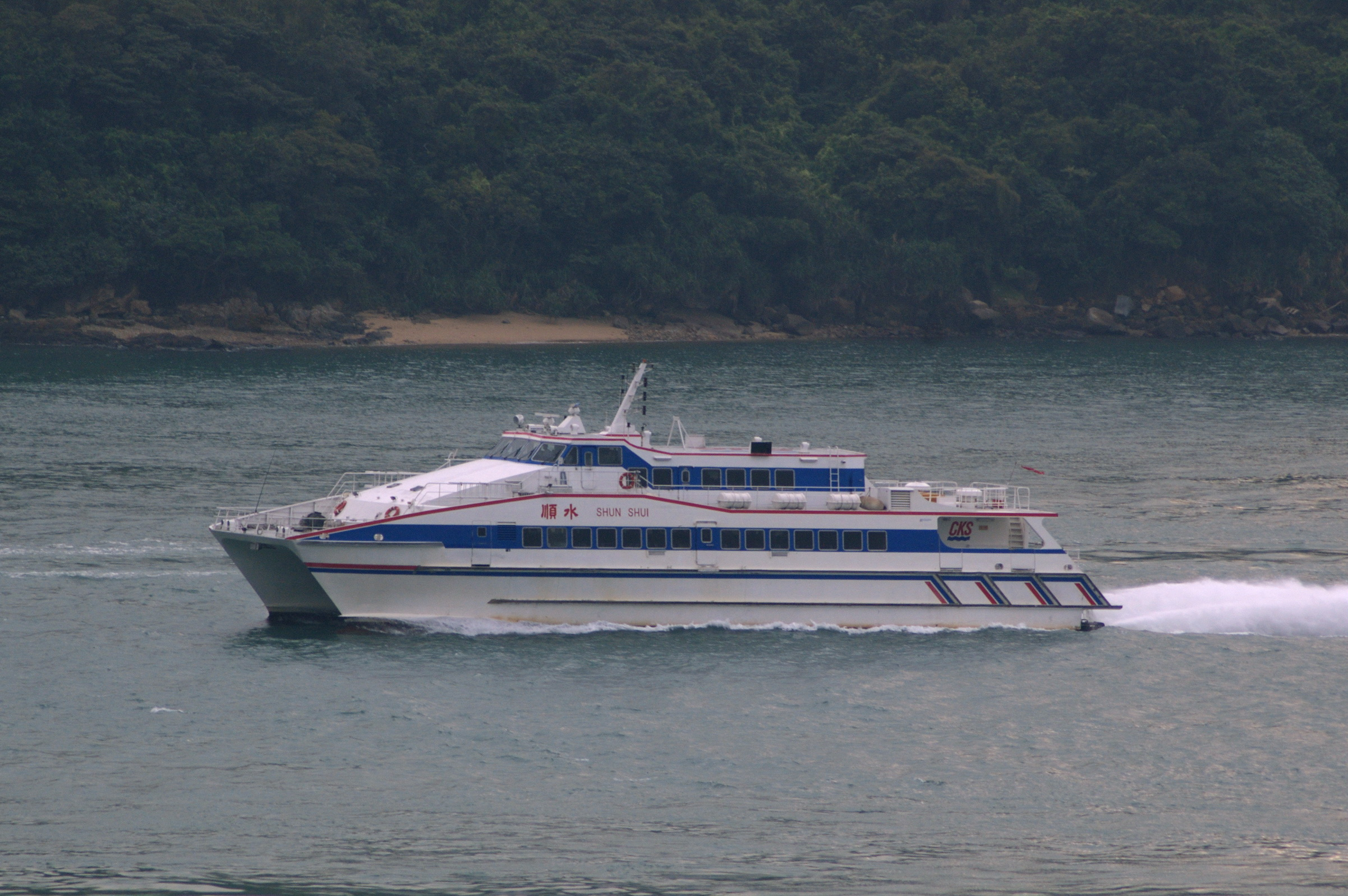
Shun Shui catamaran

The CKS fleet consists of catamarans built in Australia and China. Most ships are registered in China:

- Hai Kun: 352 passenger ex-Zhao-Qing delivered in 1997 by Austal Ships of Australia.
- Hai Liang (海亮)
- Hai Chi (海弛)
- Hai Zhu (海珠)
- Hai Yang (海洋)
- Hai Bin (海濱)
- Hai Chang (海昌)
- Qi Jiang (岐江)
- Zhong Shan (中山)
- Yi Xian Hu (逸仙湖)
- Xing Zhong (興中)
- Cui Heng Hu (翠亨湖)
- Shun Dei (順德)
- Shun Feng (順風)
- Shun Shui (順水)
- Shun Jing (順景)
- Lian Shan Hu (蓮山湖)
- Lian Gang Hu (蓮港湖)
- Peng Lai Hu (蓬萊湖)
- Peng Xing (鵬星)
- Wu Yi Hu (五邑湖)
- Tai Jian (太建)
- Dong Tai An (東太安)
- Dong Fang Chun (東方春)
- Gang Zhou (岡州)
- Xin He Shan (新鶴山)
- Tai Shan (台山)

== See also ==
- Transport in Hong Kong
- List of companies of China
