= Skypier =

Cross-boundary pier in Hong Kong

Coordinates: 22.3185°N 113.9444°E

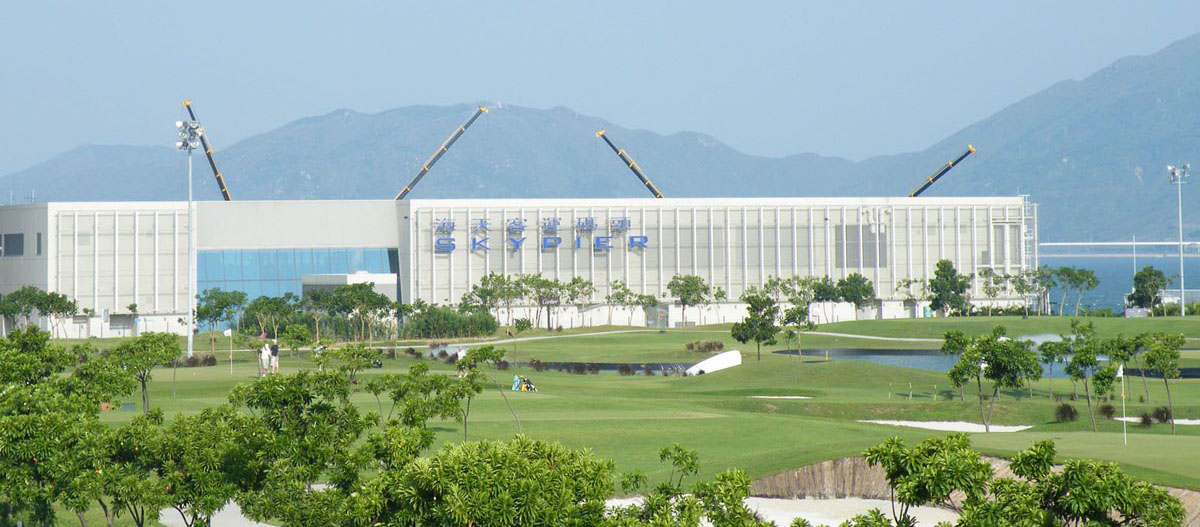
Skypier (2011)

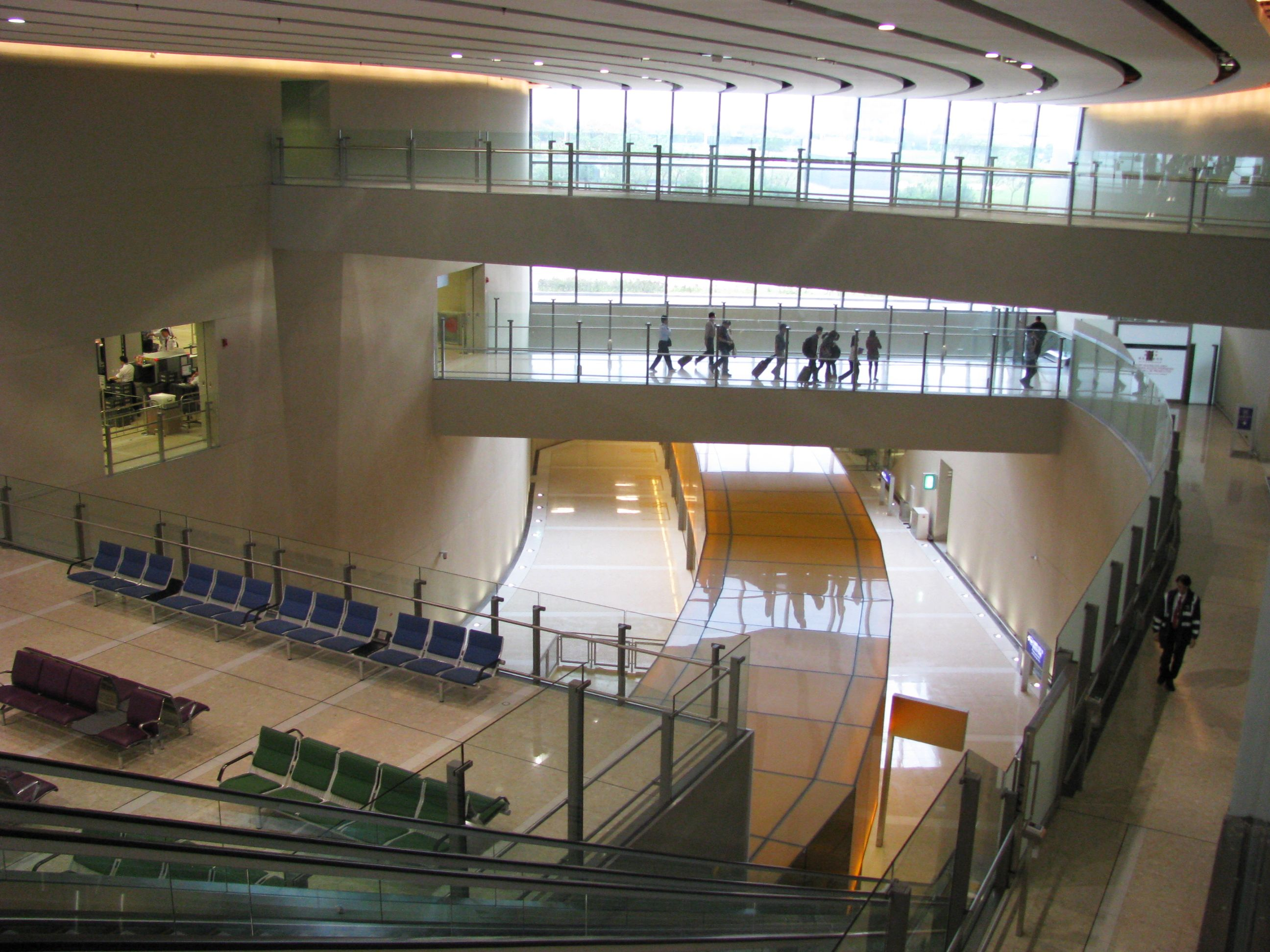
Skypier lobby

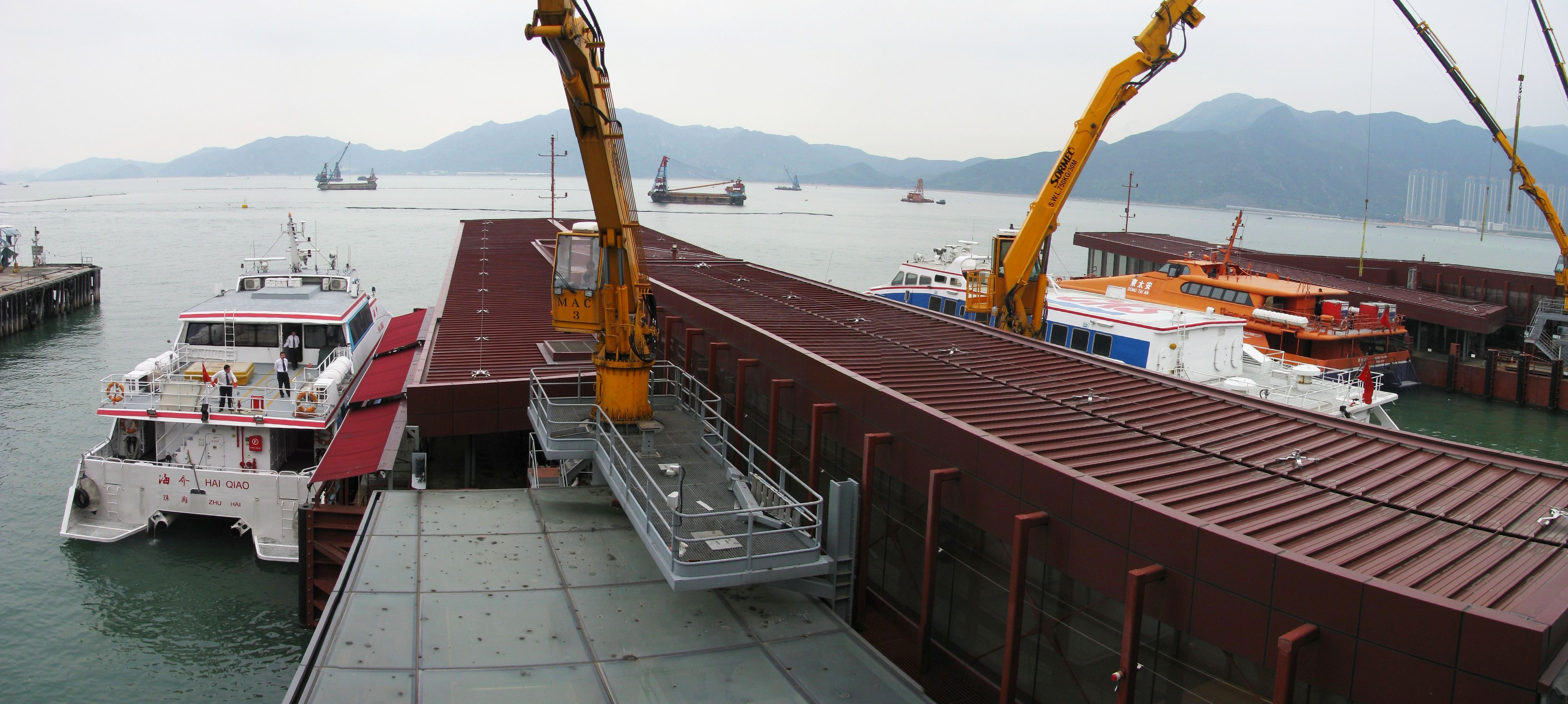
Skypier’s berth (2012)

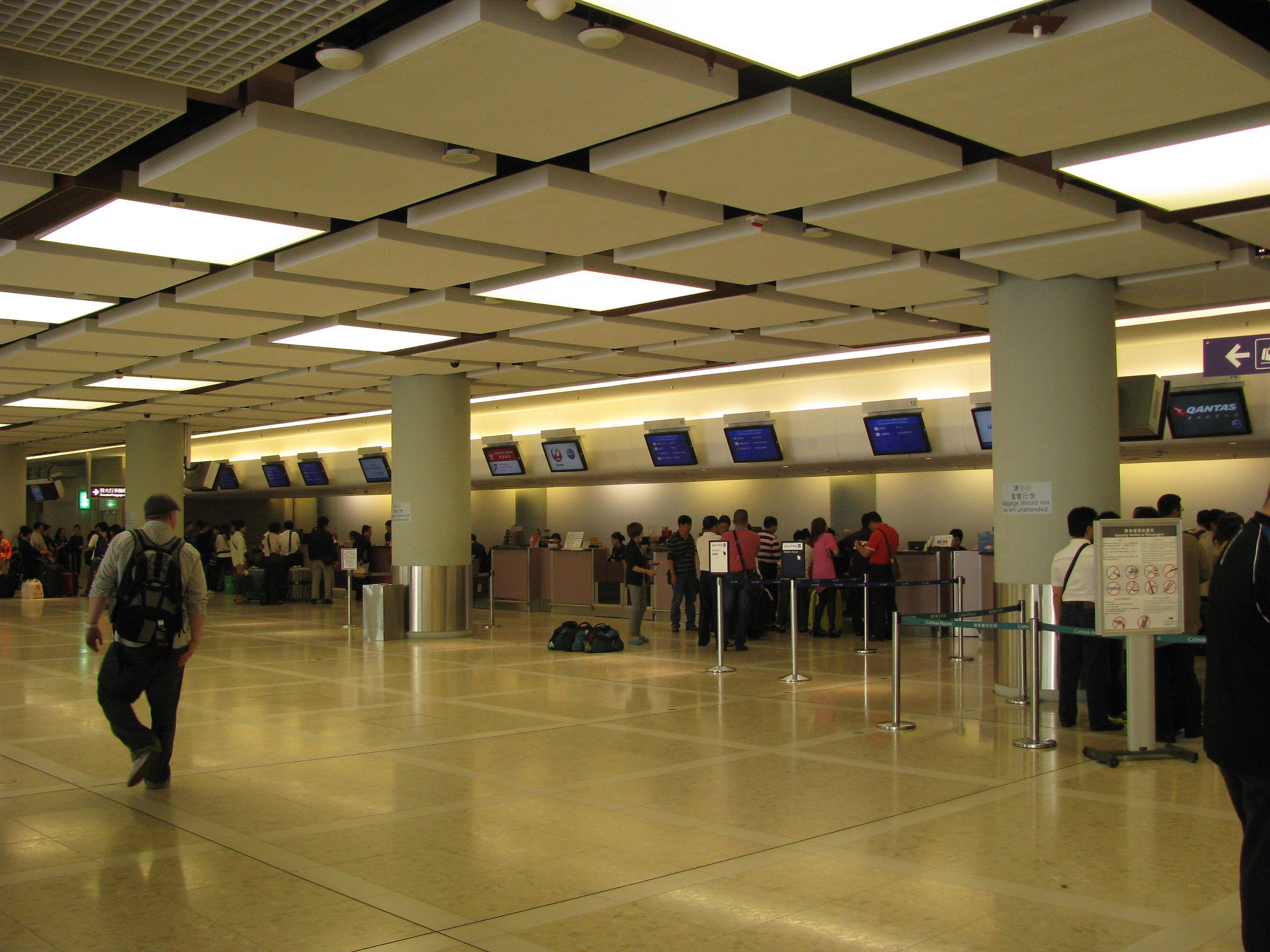
Skypier’s check in counter

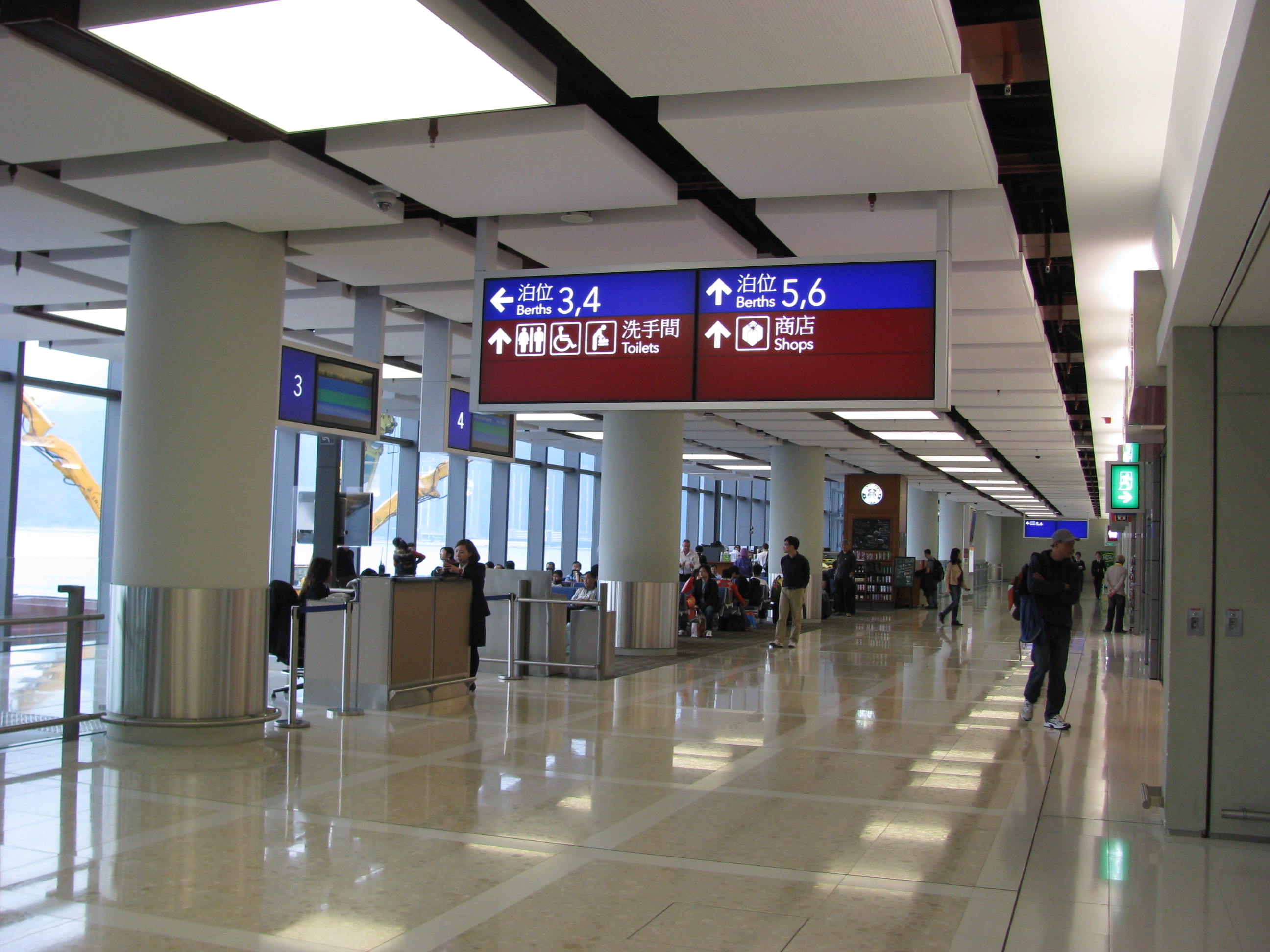
Berth boarding gates concourse (2012)

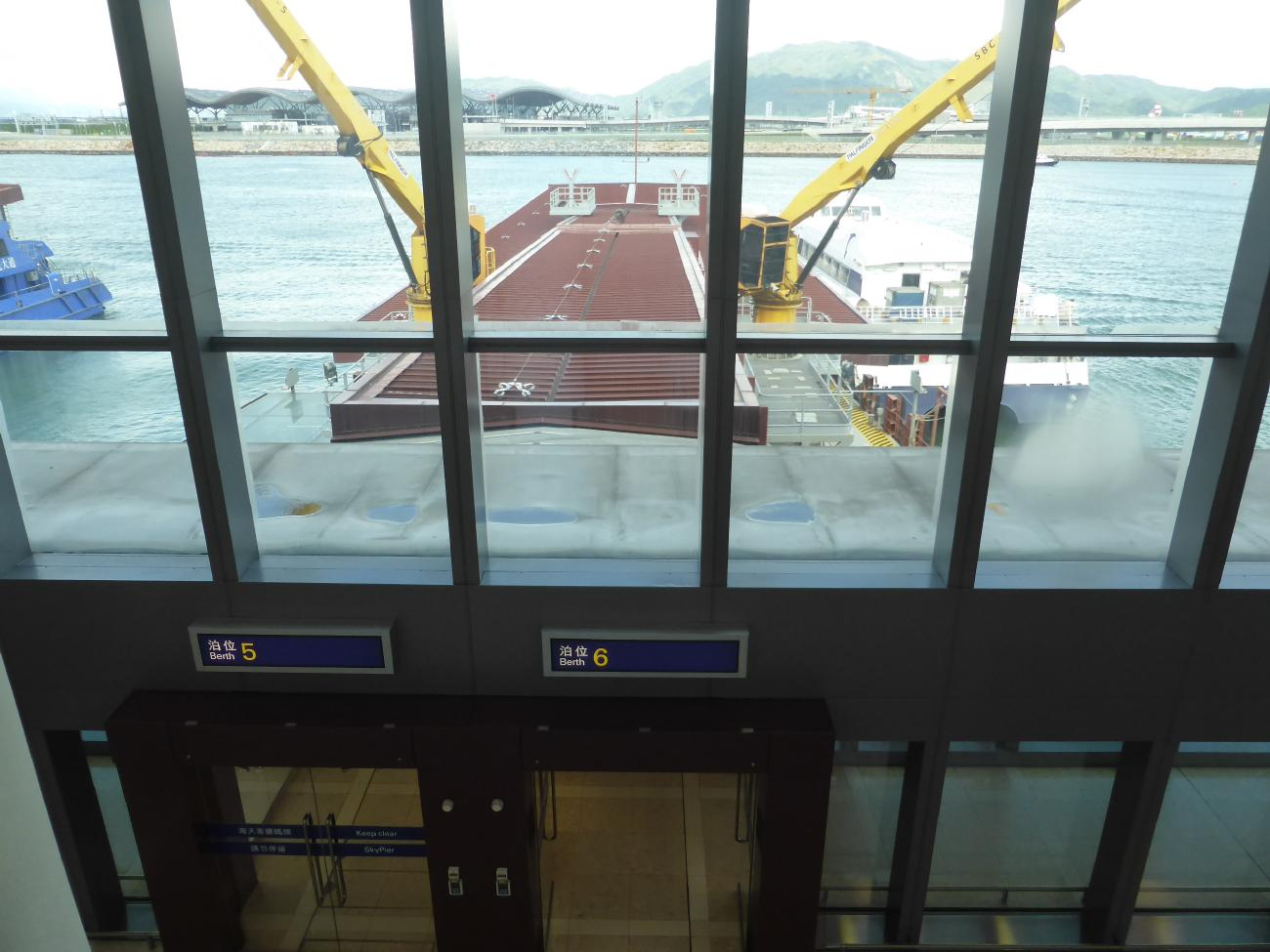
Berth boarding gates (2019)

Skypier Terminal (Chinese: 海天中轉大樓) is a cross-border facility that includes a ferry pier and a coach bay integrated within Hong Kong International Airport, Chek Lap Kok, New Territories, Hong Kong. It is operated by Hong Kong International Airport Ferry Terminal Services Limited, a joint-venture company between Chu Kong Passenger Transport Co., Ltd and Shun Tak-China Travel Ship Management Limited. At this building, passengers aboard can transit from Hong Kong International Airport to piers in the Pearl River Delta of Guangdong Province or vice versa, without immigration and customs clearance through Hong Kong. Passengers can also transit to Macao through coaches or vice versa, without immigration and customs clearance through Hong Kong.

== History ==
It was a local ferry pier called Chek Lap Kok Ferry Pier (赤鱲角渡輪碼頭). It provided a ferry route to Tuen Mun, operated by New World First Ferry. However, the route was cancelled and replaced by another route between Tuen Mun and Tung Chung New Development Ferry Pier in 2002, because the Hong Kong Airport Authority took back the pier for its own development. The route between Tuen Mun and Tung Chung ceased operation in 2008.

The pier is linked to the airport terminal by an extension of the Hong Kong International Airport Automated People Mover opened in December 2009, enabling travellers using the Skypier to avoid immigration and customs formalities at HKIA, cutting travel times.

Hong Kong Government agreed to construct a facility for serving passengers transiting by coaches or limousines through the Hong Kong–Zhuhai–Macau Bridge. Construction for the facility, which would be considered as an extension to the Skypier, begins in 2017. The facility, alongside a flyover to connect to the bridge, was completed on 30 August 2023. Coach service to Macao Checkpoint begins to call at this building on the same day. Upstream check in service at Macao Checkpoint also begins on the same day.

== Future development ==
Hong Kong Government agreed to consider the suggestion for Skypier to provide cross-border ferry services to non-transit passengers, in order to complement the development of Tung Chung by creating more business and job opportunities for the local communities. Located beside AsiaWorld Expo and Hong Kong Skycity Marriott Hotel, Skypier provides ferry services for transit passengers from Hong Kong International Airport. Architecture firm Aedas designed Skypier.

The plan to turn Skypier into a control point was nevertheless shelved.

== Ferry service ==
The building currently provides ferry routes to and from multiple cities in the Pearl River Delta.

- Routes of Chu Kong Passenger Transport Co., Ltd
  - Skypier - Shenzhen Fuyong Ferry Terminal (serving Shenzhen Bao'an International Airport), Shenzhen, China
  - Skypier - Shekou Cruise Center, Shekou, Shenzhen
  - Skypier - Taiping Port, Humen, Dongguan
  - Skypier - Zhongshan Port, Zhongshan
  - Skypier - Guangzhou Lianhuashan Port
  - Skypier - Guangzhou Pazhou Port
  - Skypier - Jiuzhou Port, Zhuhai
- Routes of TurboJET
  - Skypier - Shenzhen Bao'an International Airport, Shenzhen Fuyong Ferry Terminal, Shenzhen
  - Skypier - Guangzhou Nansha Port
  - Skypier - Outer Harbour Ferry Terminal (Terminal Marítimo), Macau
  - Skypier - Macau International Airport, Taipa Ferry Terminal, Taipa, Macau
- Routes of Cotai Jet
  - Skypier - Taipa Ferry Terminal, Taipa, Macau
  - Skypier - Outer Harbour Ferry Terminal (Terminal Marítimo), Macau

== Coach service ==
The building currently provides coach routes to and from Hong Kong-Zhuhai-Macao Bridge Macao Checkpoint.

== See also ==
- Cross Border Xpress
- Geneva International Airport
- EuroAirport Basel Mulhouse Freiburg
