= Fuyong Ferry Terminal =

Ferry terminal in Shenzhen, China

Coordinates: 22°36′19″N 113°48′33″E

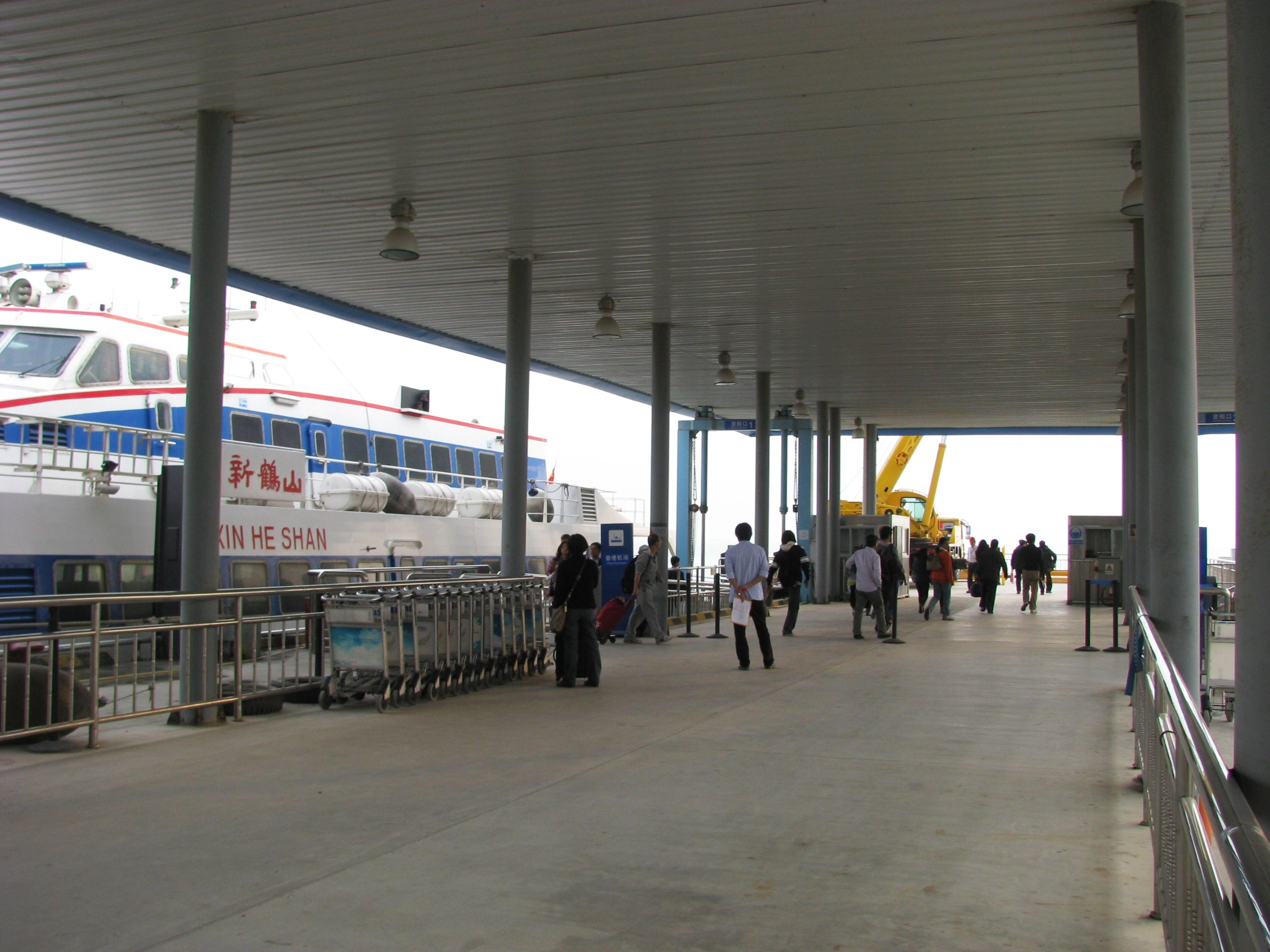
- Fuyong Pier

Other information
- IATA code: FYG
Location

Fuyong Ferry Terminal
- Simplified Chinese: 福永码头
- Traditional Chinese: 福永碼頭
Transcriptions
Standard Mandarin
- Hanyu Pinyin: Fúyǒng Mǎtóu
Yue: Cantonese
- Jyutping: fuk^{1} wing^{5} maa^{5} tau^{4}

Fuyong Ferry Terminal (Chinese: 福永码头), also known as the Shenzhen Airport Ferry Terminal, is a ferry terminal on the shore of the Pearl River, located in the Fuyong Subdistrict of the city of Shenzhen, next to Shenzhen Bao'an International Airport. Passengers have to clear China Immigration at this terminal before heading for Shenzhen Airport; however, they can obtain a 24hr transit at dock when heading for International flights.

It includes a passenger terminal for high-speed ferries connecting Shenzhen, a major city in the south of Southern China's Guangdong province, with Zhuhai, Macau, and Hong Kong.

== See also ==
- Chu Kong Passenger Transport Co., Ltd
- Shekou Cruise Center
- Shekou Ferry Terminal (old)
