= Fuyong Subdistrict =

Subdistrict of Shenzhen, China

Coordinates: 22.668907°N 113.813381°E

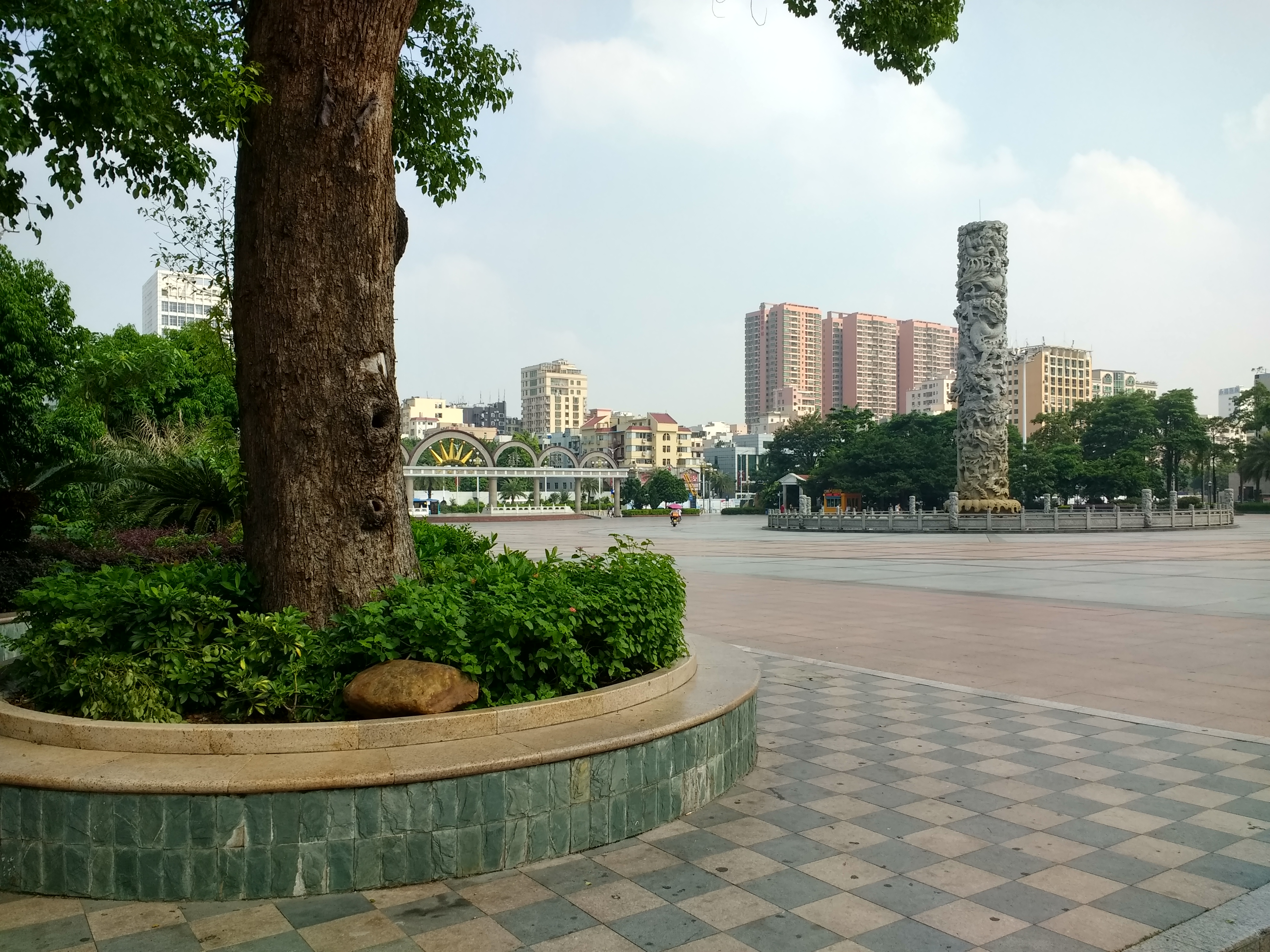
Wanfu Plaza in Fuyong Subdistrict

Fuyong subdistrict (Chinese: 福永街道) is subdistrict on the eastern bank of the Pearl River in Bao'an District, Shenzhen, Guangdong, China.

== History ==
Fenghuang Ancient Village is a 700-year-old historical settlement in the subdistrict, with 69 buildings built during the Ming (1368-1644) and Qing (1644-1911) dynasties, as well as 12 temples, 12 ancient wells and 12 ancient trees.

== Economy ==
There is a Hilton Garden hotel, the Inn Shenzhen Baoan Huaide in Fuyong Subdistrict.

== See also ==
- Shenzhen Bao'an International Airport
- Fuyong Ferry Terminal
