= He Xiangning Art Museum =

- 何香凝美术馆
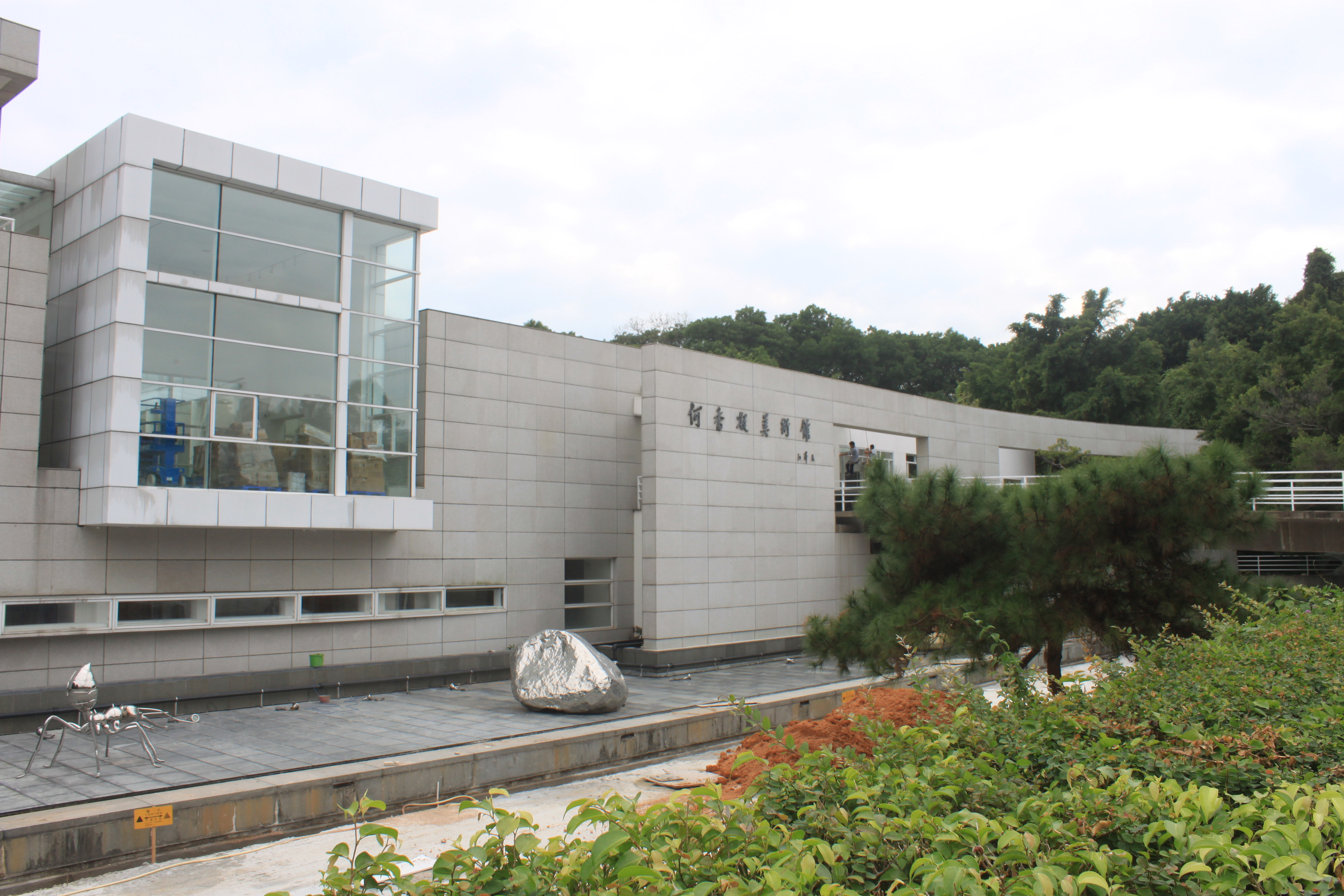
- He Xiangning Art Museum
- Established: 18 April 1997; 29 years ago
- Location: 9013 Shennan Road, Nanshan District, Shenzhen, China
- Coordinates: 22°32′21″N 113°59′17″E
- Type: Art museum
- Key holdings: He Xiangning artworks
- Collections: Modern and contemporary art
- Owner: Shenzhen government
- Website: www.hxnart.com

He Xiangning Art Museum (Chinese: 何香凝美术馆) is an art museum in Nanshan, Shenzhen, China.

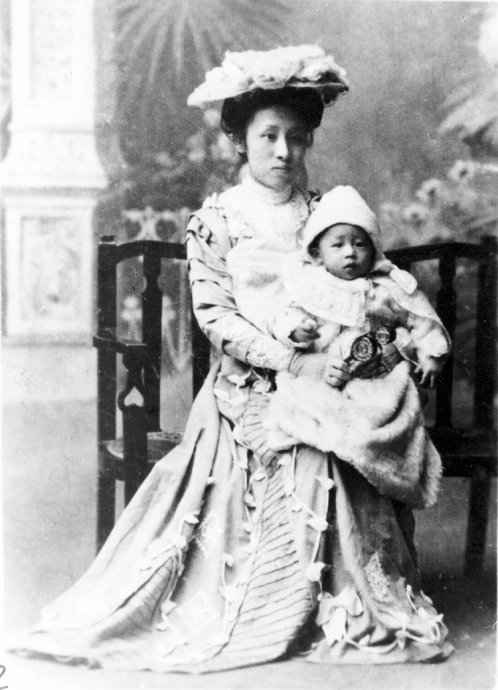
He Xiangning in 1909, holding her son Liao Chengzhi

He Xiangning Art Museum
- Simplified Chinese: 何香凝美术馆
- Traditional Chinese: 何香凝美術館
Transcriptions
Standard Mandarin
- Hanyu Pinyin: Hé Xiāngníng Měishùguǎn
Yue: Cantonese
- Jyutping: ho4 hoeng1 jing4 mei5 seot6 gun2

Construction of the museum started in 1995 and was opened on 18 April 1997. The museum is named after He Xiangning (1878–1972), painter and leading person in the Revolutionary Committee of the Chinese Kuomintang, wife of assassinated leader of the KMT left, Liao Zhongkai, mother of the late Overseas Chinese Commission Head Liao Chengzhi, and an amateur artist. It is the first national art museum in China to be named after a person. Its collections include some artworks by He Xiangning herself, and it holds regular exhibitions and displays of contemporary art.

== Location ==
The museum is located in the Overseas Chinese Town (OCT) area. Before the establishment of the Shenzhen SEZ, the Overseas Chinese Town area was a State Farm administered by the Overseas Chinese Commission. The relationship between He Xiangning and the then head of the Overseas Chinese Commission, her son Liao Chengzhi, is one reason for the naming of the gallery after her. The gallery is near several tourist sites:

- Window of the World
- Splendid China Folk Village
- Yitian Holiday Plaza
