= Yitian Holiday Plaza =

- 益田假日广场
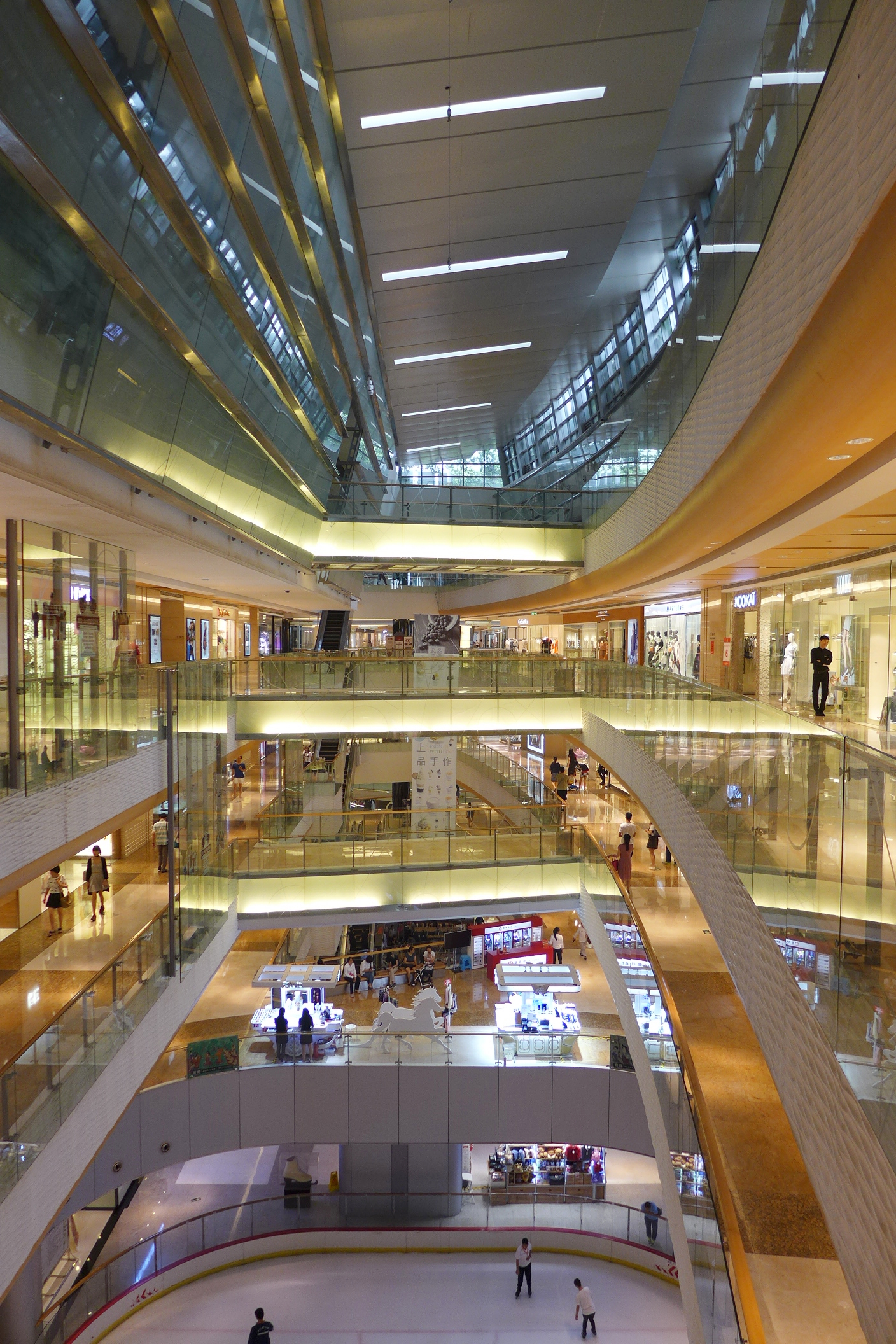
- Yitian holiday Plaza Atrium
- Location: 9028 Shennan Road, Nanshan, Shenzhen, China
- Public transit: Exit A, B and C, Window of the World Station, Shenzhen Metro
- Website: http://www.ytholidayplaza.com/

Yitian Holiday Plaza
- Simplified Chinese: 益田假日广场
- Traditional Chinese: 益田假日廣場
Transcriptions
Standard Mandarin
- Hanyu Pinyin: Yìtián Jiàrì Guǎngchǎng
Yue: Cantonese
- Jyutping: jik1 tin4 gaa3 jat6 gwong2 coeng4

Yitian Holiday Plaza (Chinese: 益田假日广场) is a shopping mall in Nanshan, Shenzhen, China. It is located within the Overseas Chinese Town (OCT) area of Shenzhen, and a walking distance from a number of theme parks such as Window of the World and Splendid China. The mall features, amongst others, a Westin Hotel, an ice rink and the first Apple retail store in Shenzhen.
