= Overseas Chinese Town station =

Metro station in Shenzhen, Guangdong, China

Coordinates: 22°32′1″N 113°59′7″E

Overseas China Town OCT 华侨城
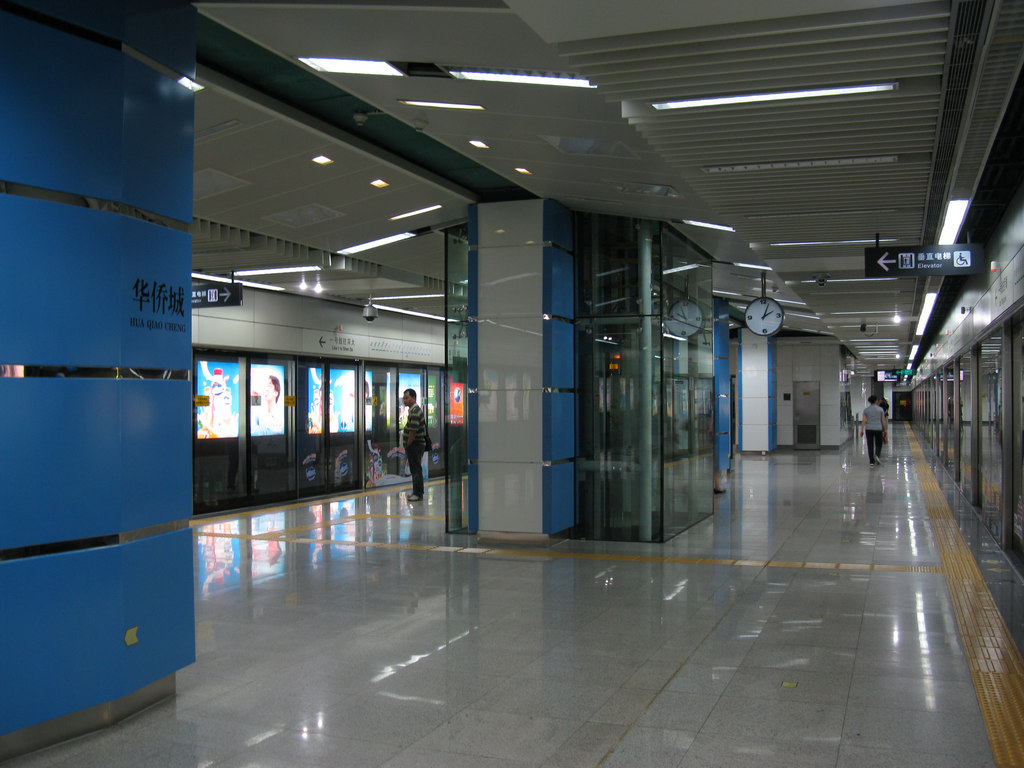

Chinese name
- Traditional Chinese: 華僑城
- Simplified Chinese: 华侨城
- Literal meaning: Overseas Chinese Town
Transcriptions
Standard Mandarin
- Hanyu Pinyin: Huá Qiáo Chéng
Yue: Cantonese
- Jyutping: Waa4 Kiu4 Sing4

General information
- Other names: Huaqiaocheng
- Location: Nanshan District, Shenzhen, Guangdong; China
- Operated by: SZMC (Shenzhen Metro Group)
- Line: Line 1
- Platforms: 2 (1 island platform)
- Tracks: 2

Construction
- Structure type: Underground
- Accessible: Yes

Other information
- Station code: 117

History
- Opened: 28 December 2004; 21 years ago

Services
Preceding station	Shenzhen Metro	Following station
Window of the World towards Airport East	Line 1	Qiaocheng East towards Luohu
Route map
Location

OCT station (simplified Chinese: 华侨城站; traditional Chinese: 華僑城站; pinyin: Huáqiáochéng zhàn; Jyutping: Waa4 Kiu4 Sing4 Zaam6), also referred to as Overseas Chinese Town station in English, and formerly known as Huaqiaocheng station, is a station on Line 1 of the Shenzhen Metro. It opened on 28 December 2004. It is located underground at Shennan Dadao (深南大道), near Shenzhen Bay Hotel (深圳湾大酒店; 深圳灣大酒店), in Nanshan District, Shenzhen, China. The station is named after Overseas Chinese Town. It is also located close to Splendid China Folk Village and China Folk Culture Village.

== Station layout ==
G	-	Exit
B1F; Concourse	Lobby	Customer Service, Shops, Vending machines, ATMs
B2F; Platforms	Platform 1	← Line 1 towards Airport East (Window of the World)
B2F; Platforms	Island platform, doors will open on the left
B2F; Platforms	Platform 2	Line 1 towards Luohu (Qiaocheng East) →

== Exits ==
Exit	Destination
Exit A	Shennan Boulevard (N), Huaxia Art Center, City Inn Xinqiao, Seaview O·City Hotel Shenzhen
Exit B	Shennan Boulevard (N), Qiaocheng East Street, Overseas Chinese Town (OCT), OCT Middle School, Huaxia Art Center, Hantang Building, Walmart OCT Store
Exit C	Shennan Boulevard (S), Dongfang Garden, He Xiangning Art Museum, The OCT Art & Design Gallery
Exit D	Shennan Boulevard (S), China Folk Culture Village, Splendid China

== See also ==
- Overseas Chinese Town
