= Overseas Chinese Town =

Area of Shenzhen, Guangdong, China

Coordinates: 22.5352°N 113.9834°E

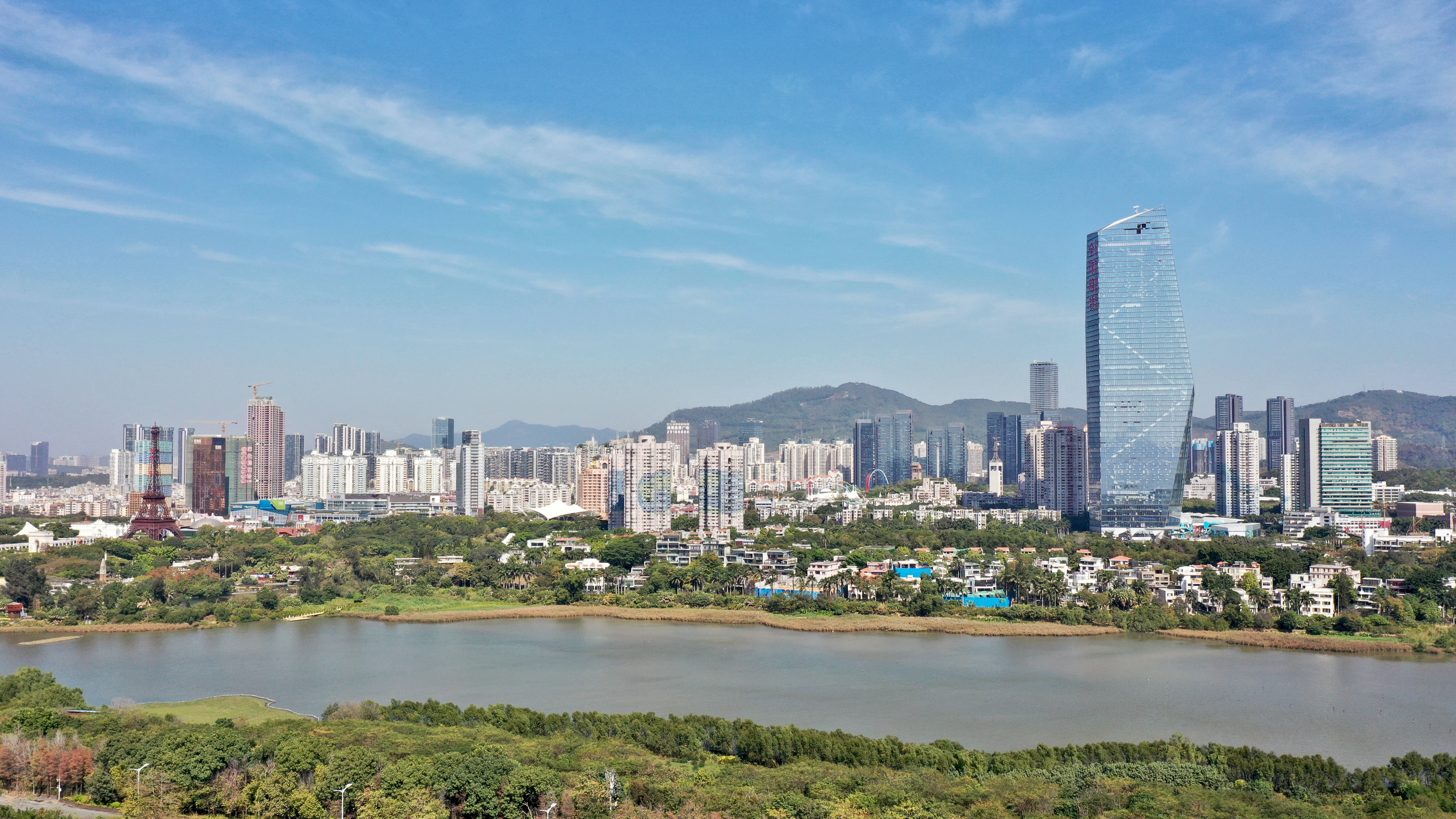
Overseas Chinese Town in 2020

Overseas Chinese Town (OCT, simplified Chinese: 华侨城; traditional Chinese: 華僑城; pinyin: huáqiáo chéng; Jyutping: Waa4 Kiu4 Sing4) is the colloquial name for a cluster of scenic spots in Nanshan District of Shenzhen, Guangdong Province, China, around the Window of the World Station, Overseas Chinese Town Station, Qiaocheng East Station and Qiaocheng North Station of the Luobao Line (Line 1) and Shekou Line (Line 2) of Shenzhen Metro. The Meilin Line (Line 9) also passes this area and serves OCT Harbour (OCT Bay) and the University of Hong Kong-Shenzhen Hospital with Shenzhen Bay Park station. It is classified as an AAAAA scenic area by the China National Tourism Administration.

== Main sights ==
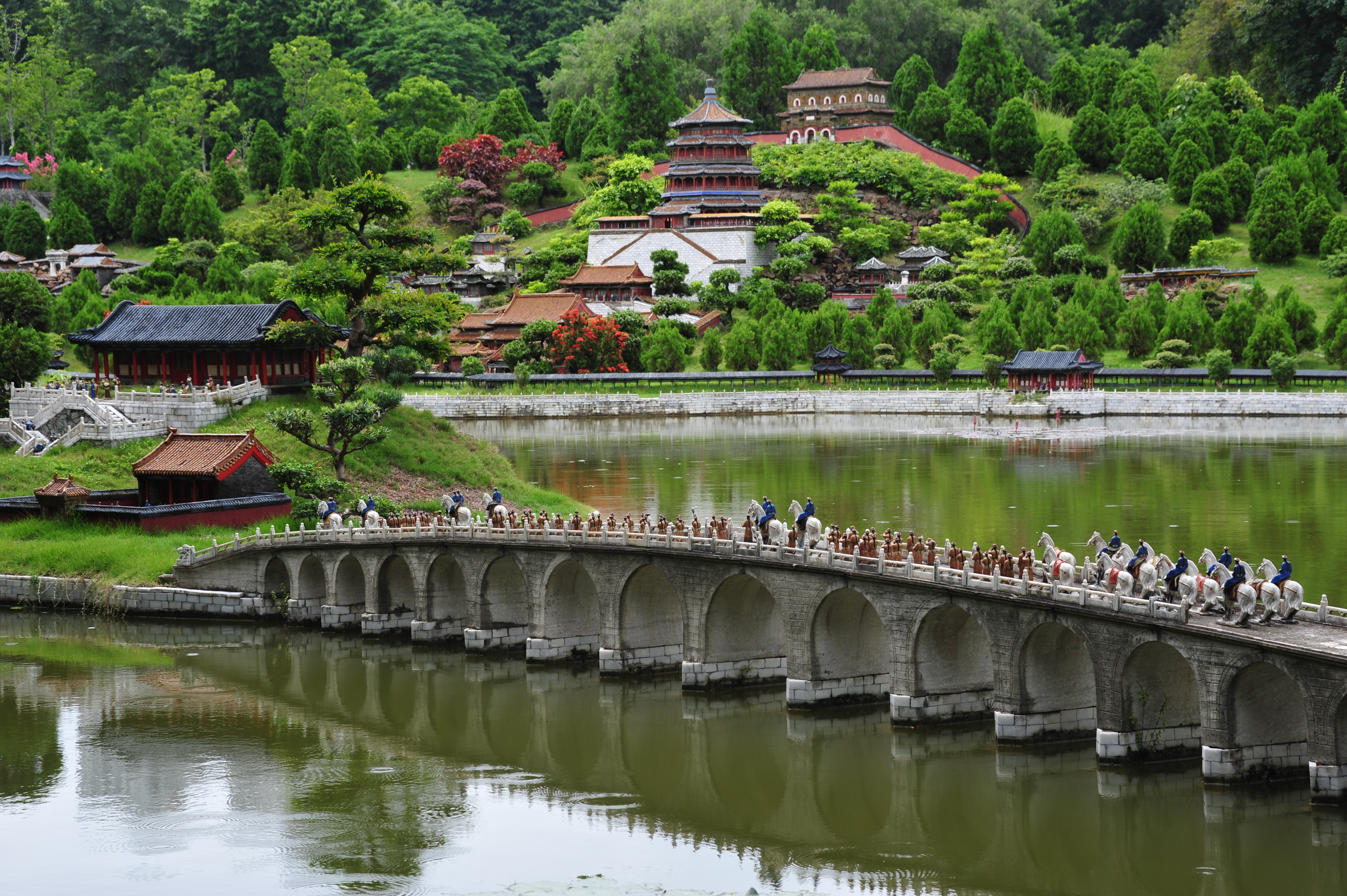
Splendid China theme park

The area features a number of theme parks, they include Splendid China, Chinese Folk Culture Village, Window of the World, and Happy Valley Shenzhen. It is currently owned and operated by Overseas Chinese Town Enterprises and its subsidiaries. OCT Tower is situated here.

OCT Contemporary Art Terminal is in the community.

Extensions have been made in different locations within Shenzhen. These include Overseas Chinese Town East in Yantian and Overseas Chinese Town Bay.

== History ==
The development of the Overseas Chinese Town (OCT) traces its origins to the Shahe Farmland, established in 1959. Initially comprising three villages - Upper Baishi, Lower Baishi, and Xintang - the Shahe Farmland was conceived as a means of fostering systematic management to enhance agricultural productivity. The farms predate Shenzhen's official founding as a city and are maintained by the Bureau of Reclamation of Foshan, Guangdong Province.

The expansion of the Shahe Farmland occurred incrementally, with the addition of Baishizhou in 1960-1961 and Tangtou in 1962. The latter was formed as a result of the relocation of local residents due to the construction of the Shiyan Lake Reservoir in Bao'an. However, there was a lot of administrative instability throughout this time, with several changes in farmland administration. Initially under the control of the Guangzhou Military Upper Command in 1961, it later transitioned to the special administrative area of Huiyang in 1965, before ultimately falling under the jurisdiction of the Cantonese Farm Service Agency as part of the Guangming Overseas Chinese Farmland in the subsequent year.

The Chinese Economic Reform, initiated on December 18, 1978, marked a significant shift in China's economic strategy. Under the leadership of Chairman Deng Xiaoping, the reform agenda aimed at unleashing economic potential through measures such as permitting entrepreneurship, de-collectivizing agriculture, and opening up to foreign investment. Special Economic Zones (SEZs) like Shenzhen, established as experimental areas with relaxed regulations, played a pivotal role. The Shekou Industrial Zone in Shenzhen became the first experimental port to "open up" on January 31, 1979, symbolizing China's commitment to economic liberalization and global engagement.

During the economic reform period, a significant transformation occurred in the ownership structure of various firms and development groups, including the Guangming Overseas Chinese Farmland. In the first quarter of 1980, control of the farmland shifted to the Guangdong Shahe Overseas Chinese Enterprise (广东省沙河华侨企业公司). Subsequently, on December 3, 1981, the Guangdong Shahe Overseas Chinese Farmland was established by the Shahe Enterprise, leveraging the resources and infrastructure of the Guangming Farmland.

A pivotal moment occurred on November 11, 1985, when the Shenzhen Special Economic Zone government designated 4.8 square kilometers of the farmland as a designated development district for foreign businesses and firms. This area was officially named Overseas Chinese Town (OCT) and quickly emerged as an integral component of the Shenzhen Special Economic Zone and the broader Chinese Economic Reform agenda. Situated adjacent to the Shekou Port, OCT became a hub for collaboration between local businesses and foreign companies, attracting significant foreign investments. The region's industrial and agricultural sectors were served by the construction of factories and warehouses, which further enhanced its economic significance.

Over the years, companies operating within OCT made substantial contributions to foreign exchanges and cooperation, facilitated the introduction of overseas Chinese funds, and attracted outstanding professional talents. Moreover, they played a pivotal role in facilitating the learning and adaptation of foreign advanced technology and management practices. Prominent corporations like Konka and ZTE gained substantial advantages from the establishment of Overseas Chinese Town, utilizing its assets to create cutting-edge technologies that have enjoyed enduring success from their inception to the present day. In essence, the establishment of OCT acted as a spur for the growth of Special Economic Zones and increased the pace of China's wider economic changes.

== Development ==
Between 1979 and 1982, as China embarked on its journey of economic reform, the influx of foreign investments soared to 268 billion yuan. During this same period, investments from overseas Chinese, Hong Kong, and Macau citizens accounted for 179 billion dollars, representing 65 percent of the total investments.

By 1995, the Gross Industrial Output Value of OCT had surged to 33.76 billion yuan, marking an increase of 18.6 times compared to its 1985 value. Similarly, gross income soared to 54.7 billion yuan, a 46.6-fold rise over the same period. The net income witnessed a surge, increasing by 122 times to reach 5.96 billion yuan.

== Education ==
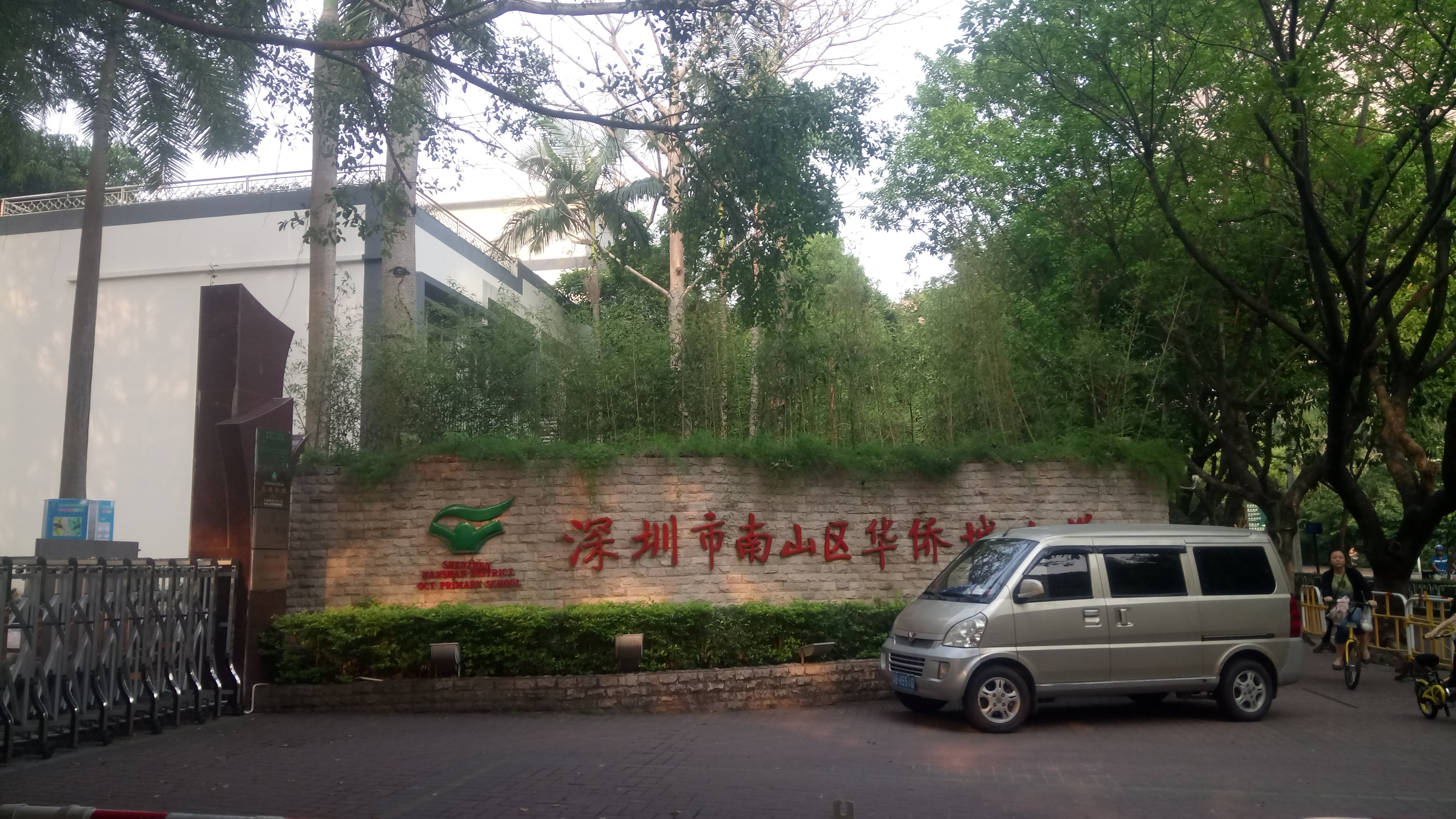
OCT Elementary School

Schools for local students:

- OCT Elementary School (华侨城小学)
- OCT High School (深圳市华侨城中学) OCT Branch (侨城部)

In addition, the Shenzhen Korean Chamber of Commerce and Industry organizes a Korean Saturday school because many Korean students are not studying in Korean-medium schools; the school had about 600 students in 2007. The chamber uses rented space in the OCT Primary School as the Korean weekend school's classroom.

== See also ==
- Huaxia Art Centre
