= Qiaocheng East station =

Metro station in Shenzhen, Guangdong, China

Coordinates: 22°31′57″N 113°59′44″E

Qiaocheng East 侨城东
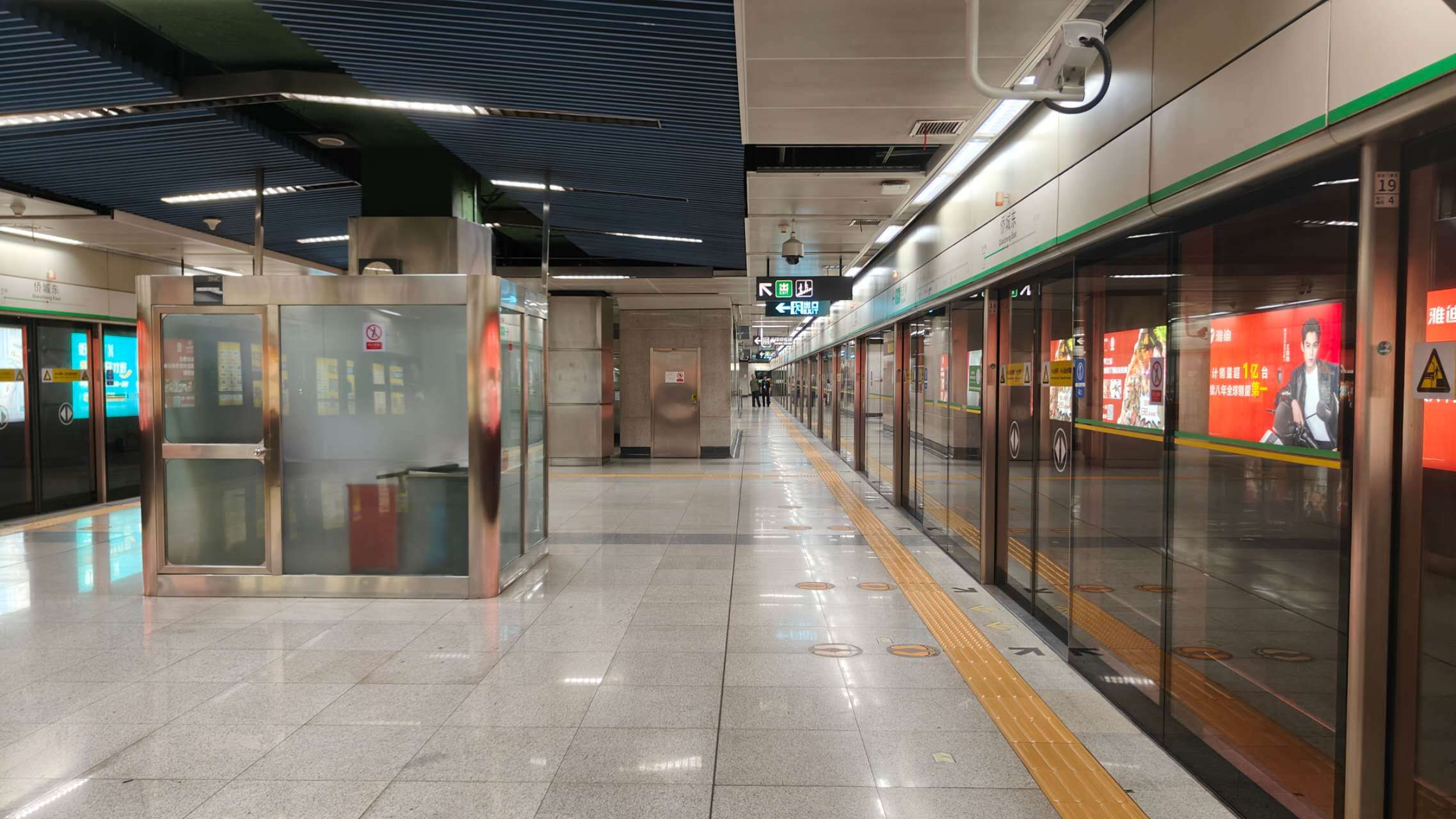

Chinese name
- Traditional Chinese: 僑城東
- Simplified Chinese: 侨城东
- Literal meaning: Overseas Chinese Town East
Transcriptions
Standard Mandarin
- Hanyu Pinyin: Qiáochéngdōng
Yue: Cantonese
- Yale Romanization: Kìuhsìhngdūng
- Jyutping: kiu^{4} sing^{4} dung^{1}

General information
- Other names: Qiaochengdong
- Location: Intersection of Qiaocheng East Road (侨城东路) and Shennan Boulevard (深南大道); Futian District, Shenzhen, Guangdong; China
- Operated by: SZMC (Shenzhen Metro Group)
- Line: Line 1
- Platforms: 2 (1 island platform)
- Tracks: 2

Construction
- Structure type: Underground
- Accessible: Yes

Other information
- Station code: 118

History
- Opened: 28 December 2004; 21 years ago

Services
Preceding station	Shenzhen Metro	Following station
OCT towards Airport East	Line 1	Zhuzilin towards Luohu
Route map
Location

Qiaocheng East station (Chinese: 侨城东站; pinyin: Qiáochéngdōng Zhàn; Jyutping: kiu^{4} sing^{4} dung^{1} zaam^{6}), formerly Qiaochengdong station, is a station on Line 1 of the Shenzhen Metro. It opened on 28 December 2004. It is near the east end of Splendid China Folk Village and Overseas Chinese Town, hence its name.

== Station layout ==
G	–	Exits A-C2
B1F; Concourse	Lobby	Ticket Machines, Customer Service
B2F; Platforms	1 towards Airport East (OCT)
B2F; Platforms	Island platform, doors will open on the left
B2F; Platforms	1 towards Luohu (Zhuzilin)

=== Entrances/exits ===
This station has 4 points of entry/exit. Exits A, B, and C1 are equipped with escalators. Exit B is accessible via an elevator.

- : Shennan Boulevard, Qiaocheng East Road, Shenzhen Police Training School, Yuanboyuan Park
- : Shennan Boulevard, Yunhao Road, Splendid China Folk Village
- : Qiaocheng East Road, Jin Cheng Community Service Center
- : Shennan Boulevard, Qiaocheng East Road, Shenzhen Metro Zhuzilin Depot
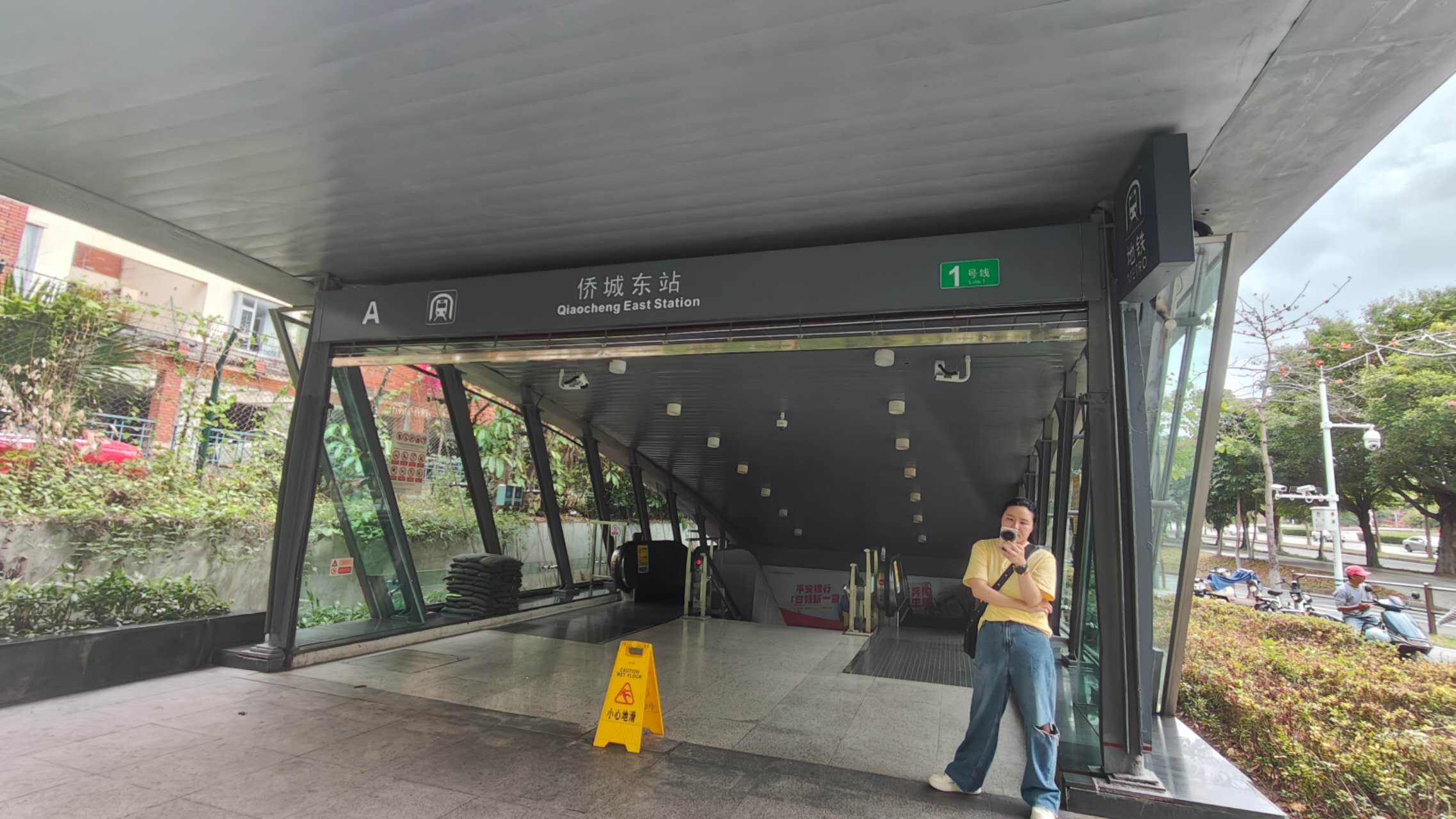
Exit A

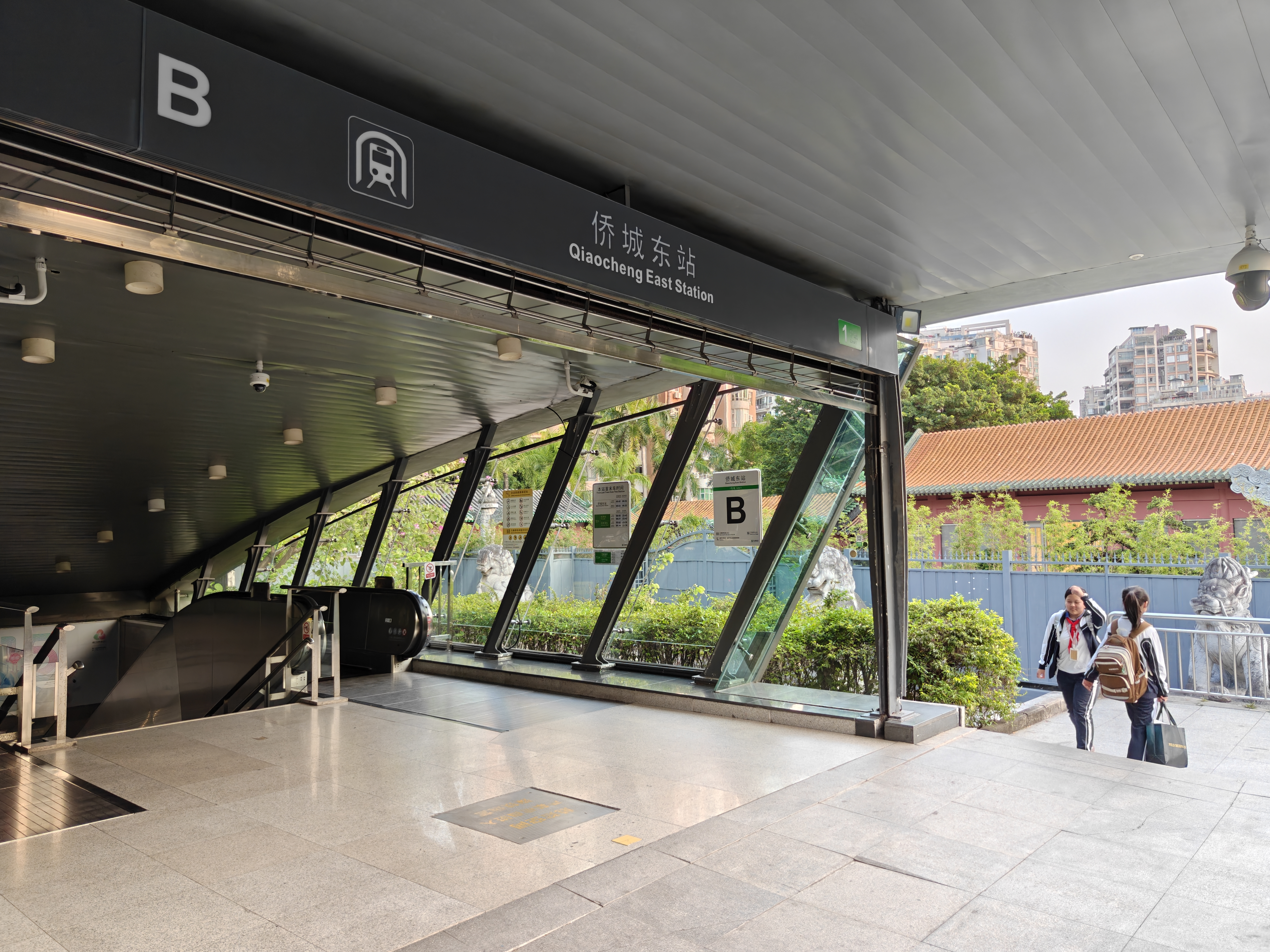
Exit B

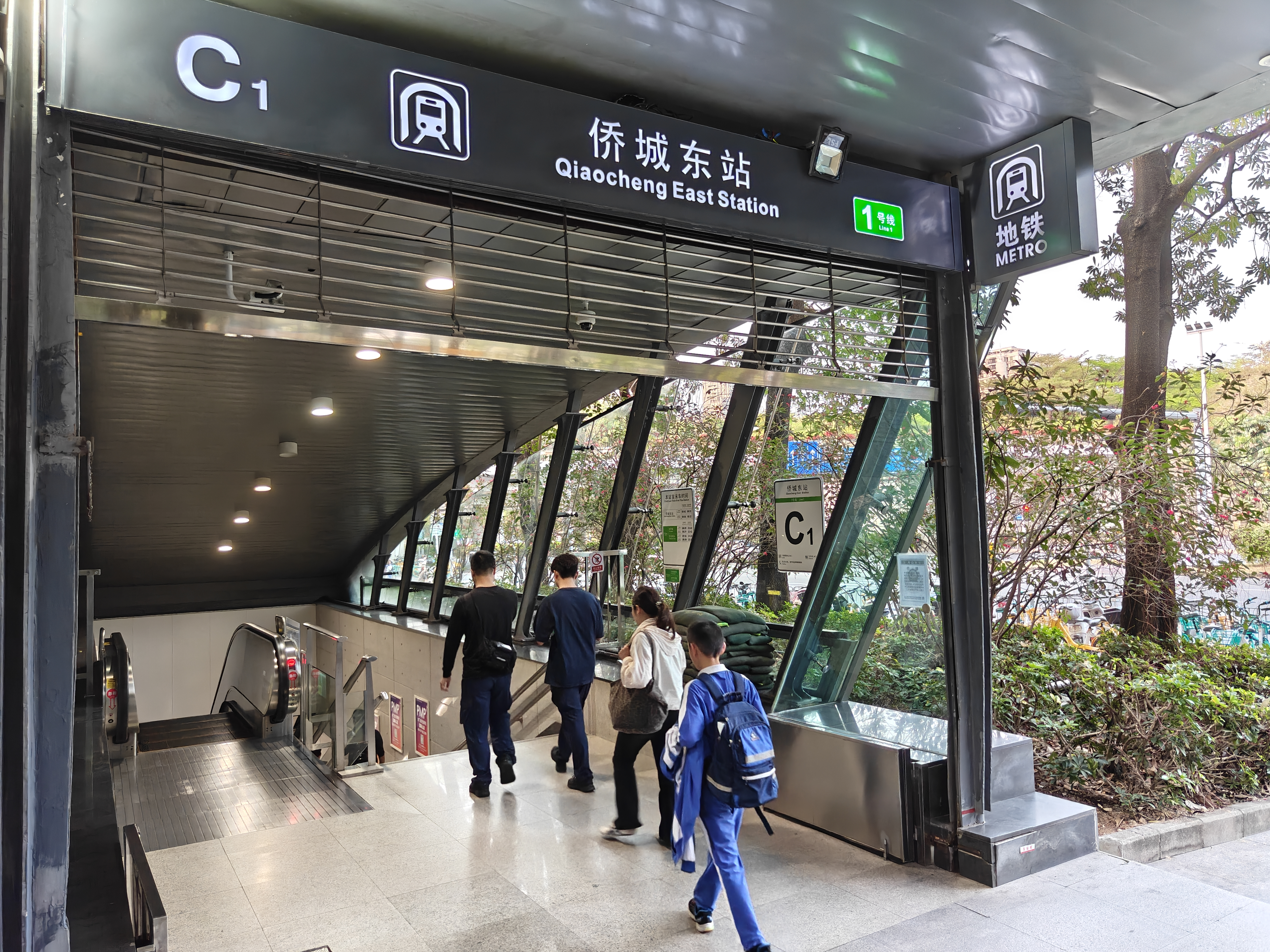
Exit C1

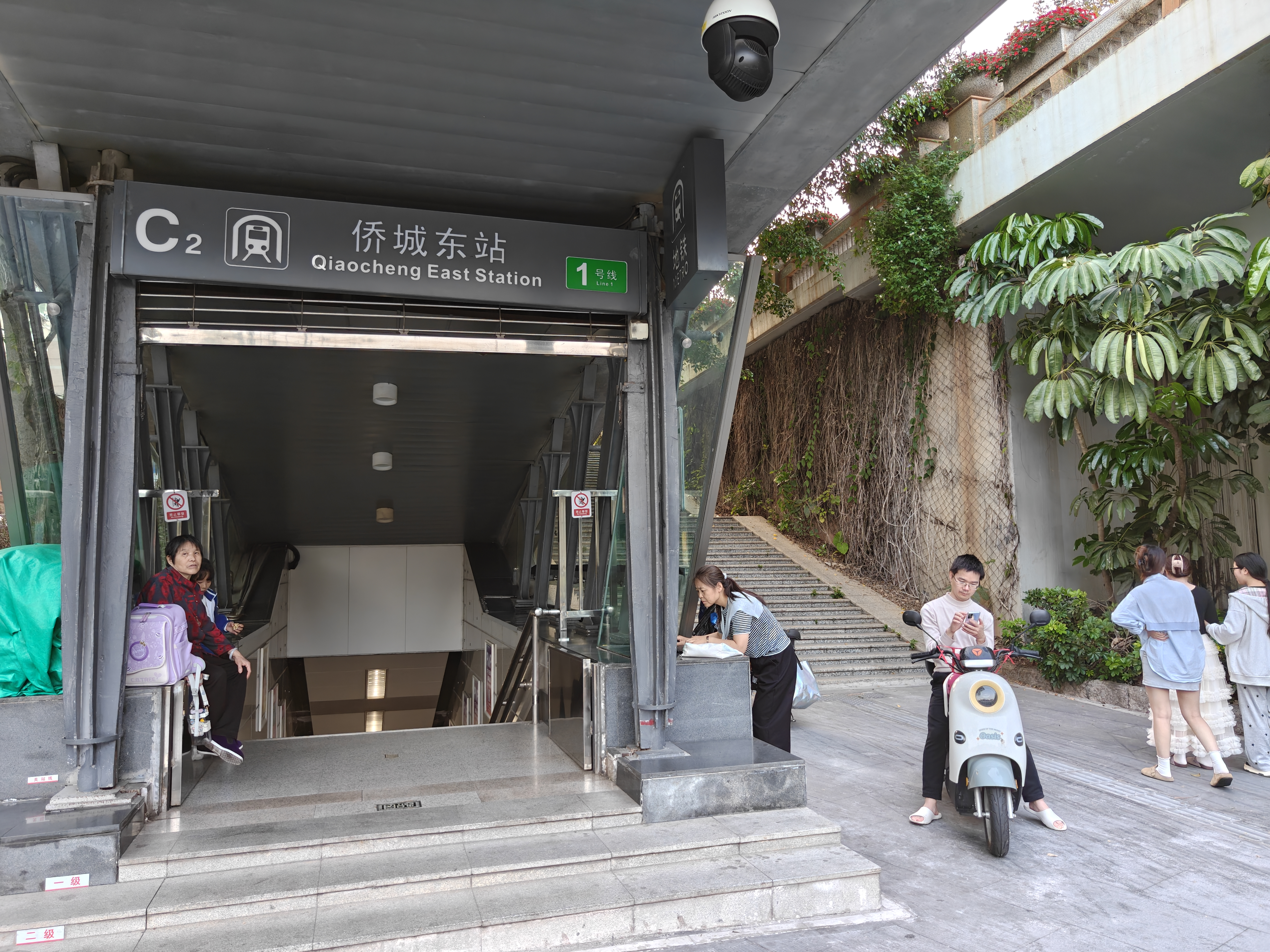
Exit C2

== Gallery ==
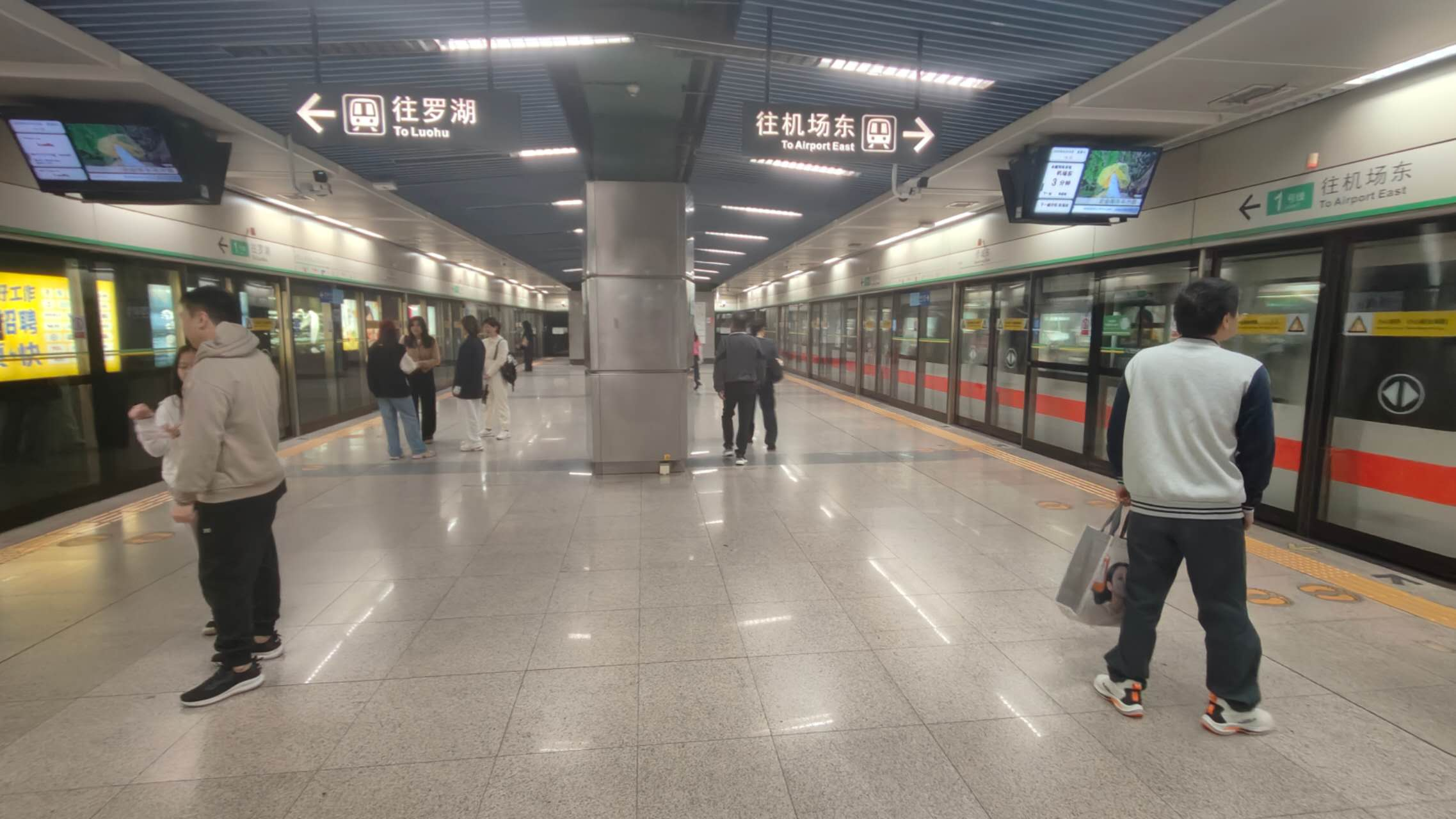
Platforms (2025)

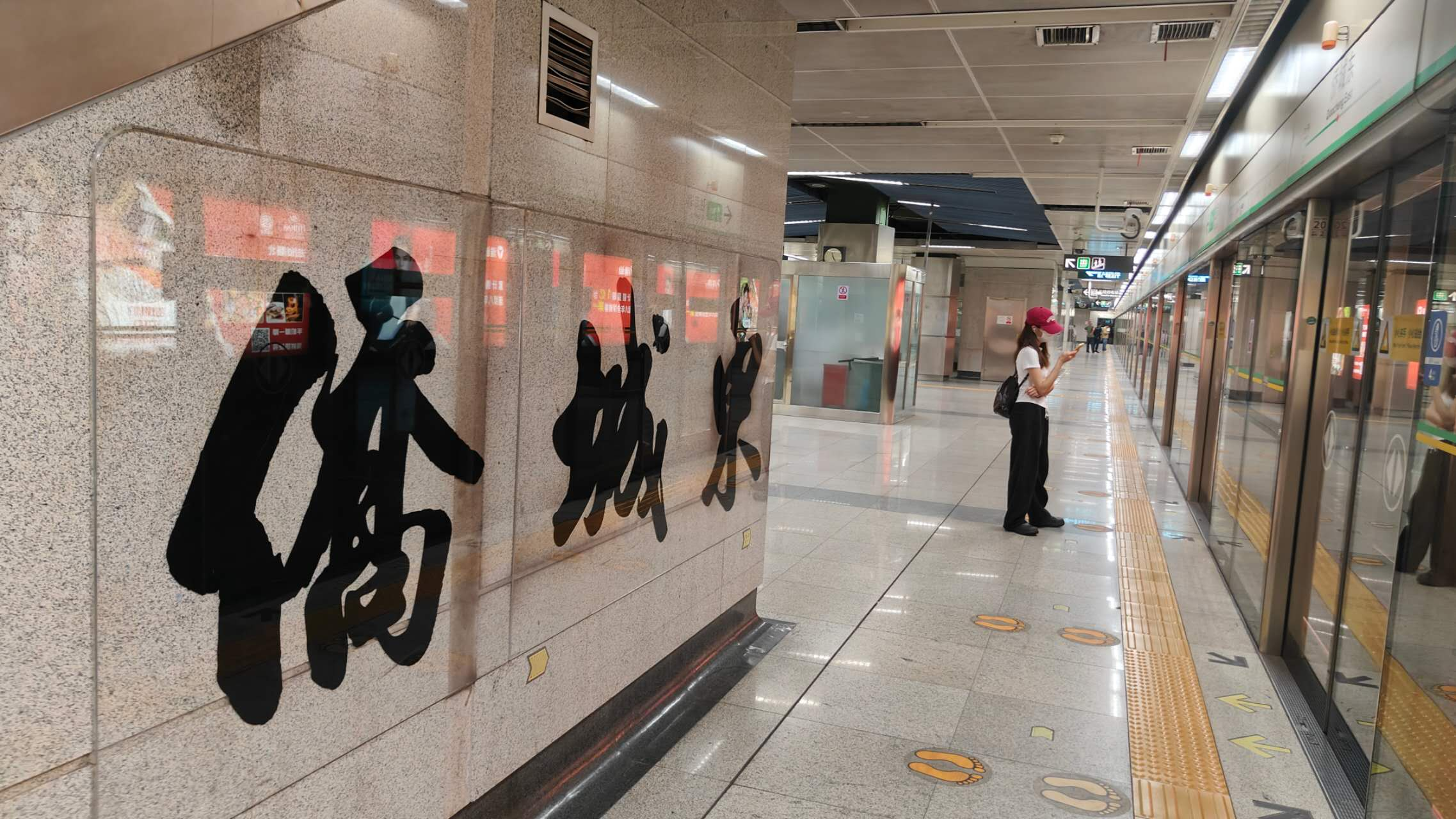
Platform Calligraphy (2025)

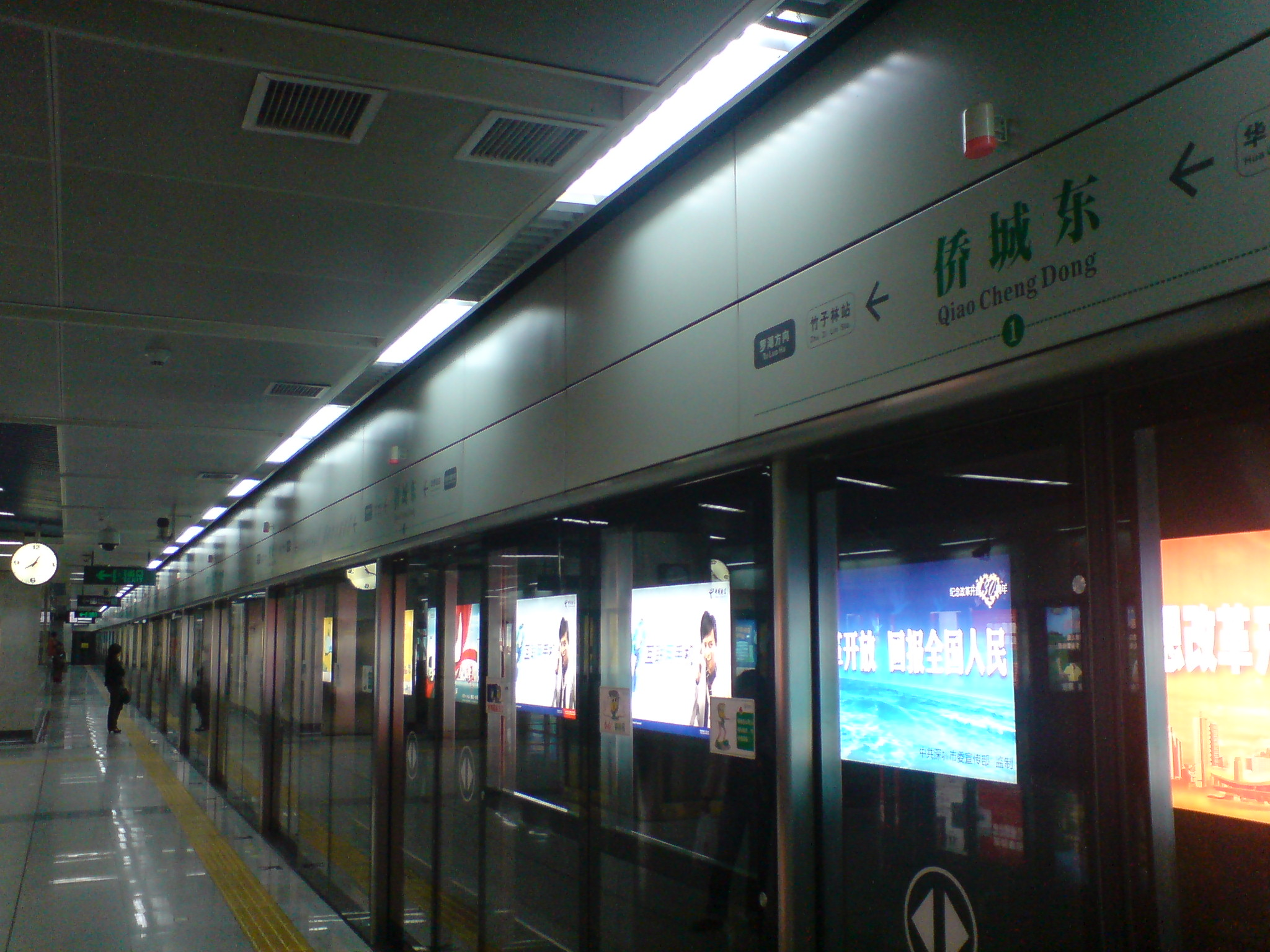
Platform Screen Doors (2009)

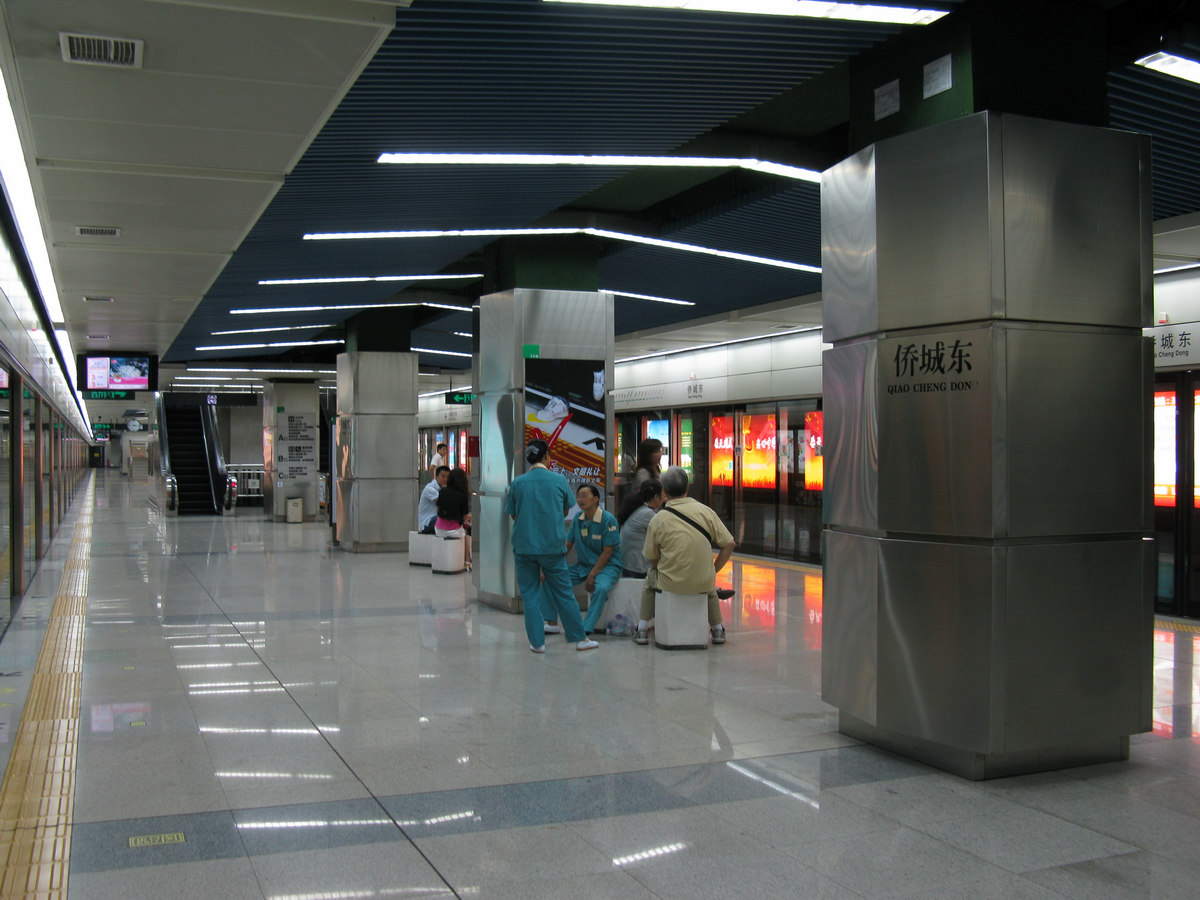
Platforms (2009)

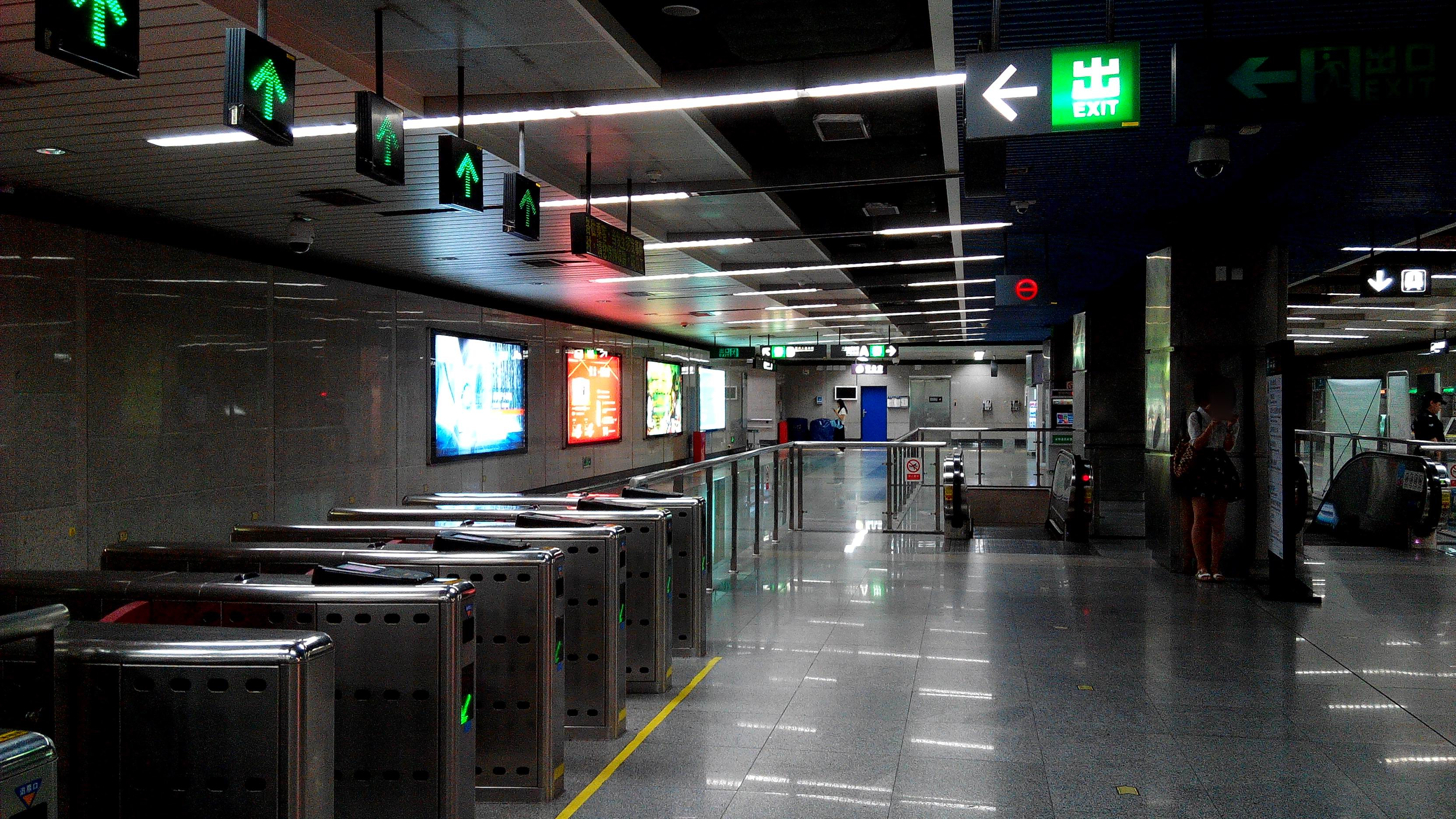
Concourse (2016)

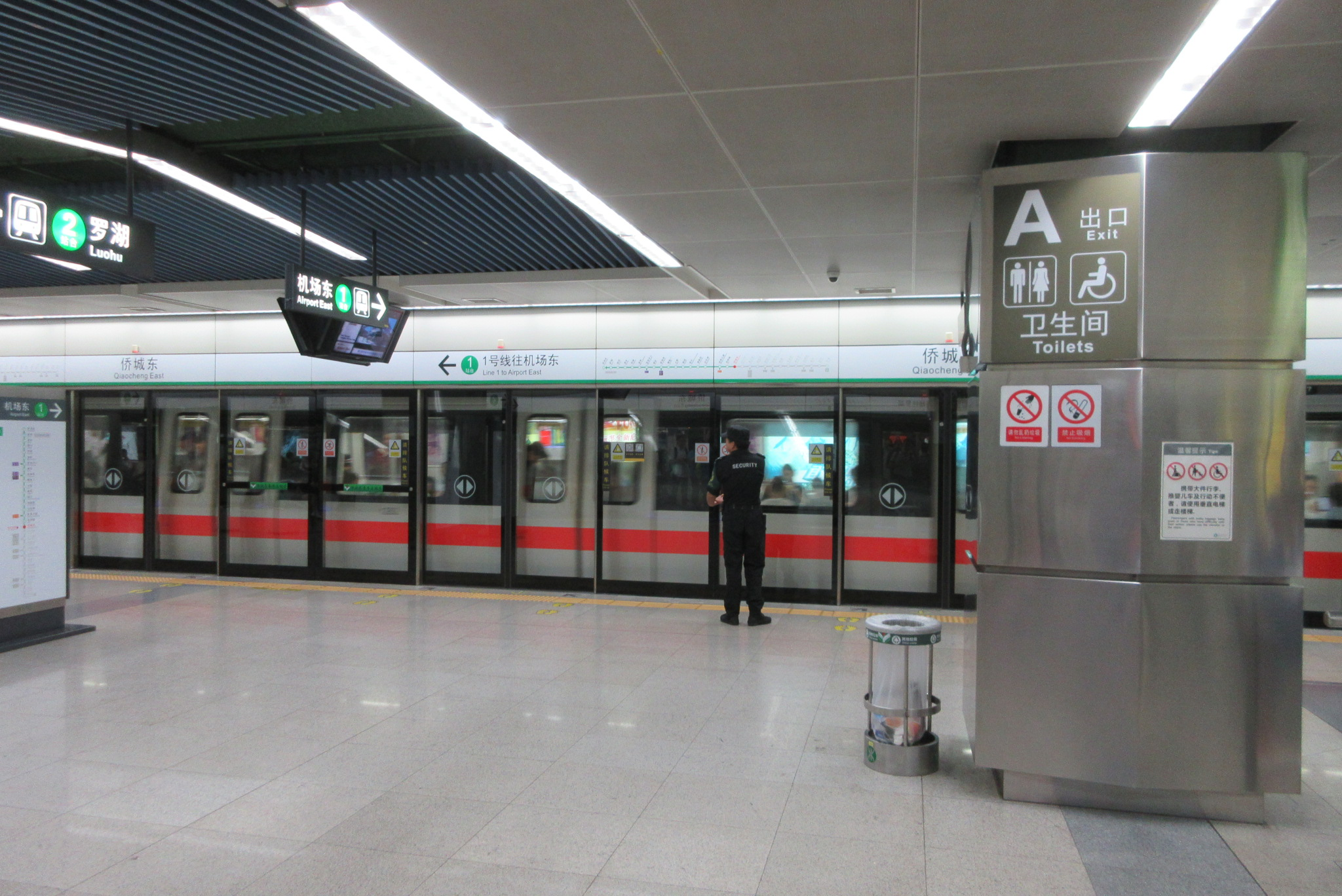
Platforms (2017)

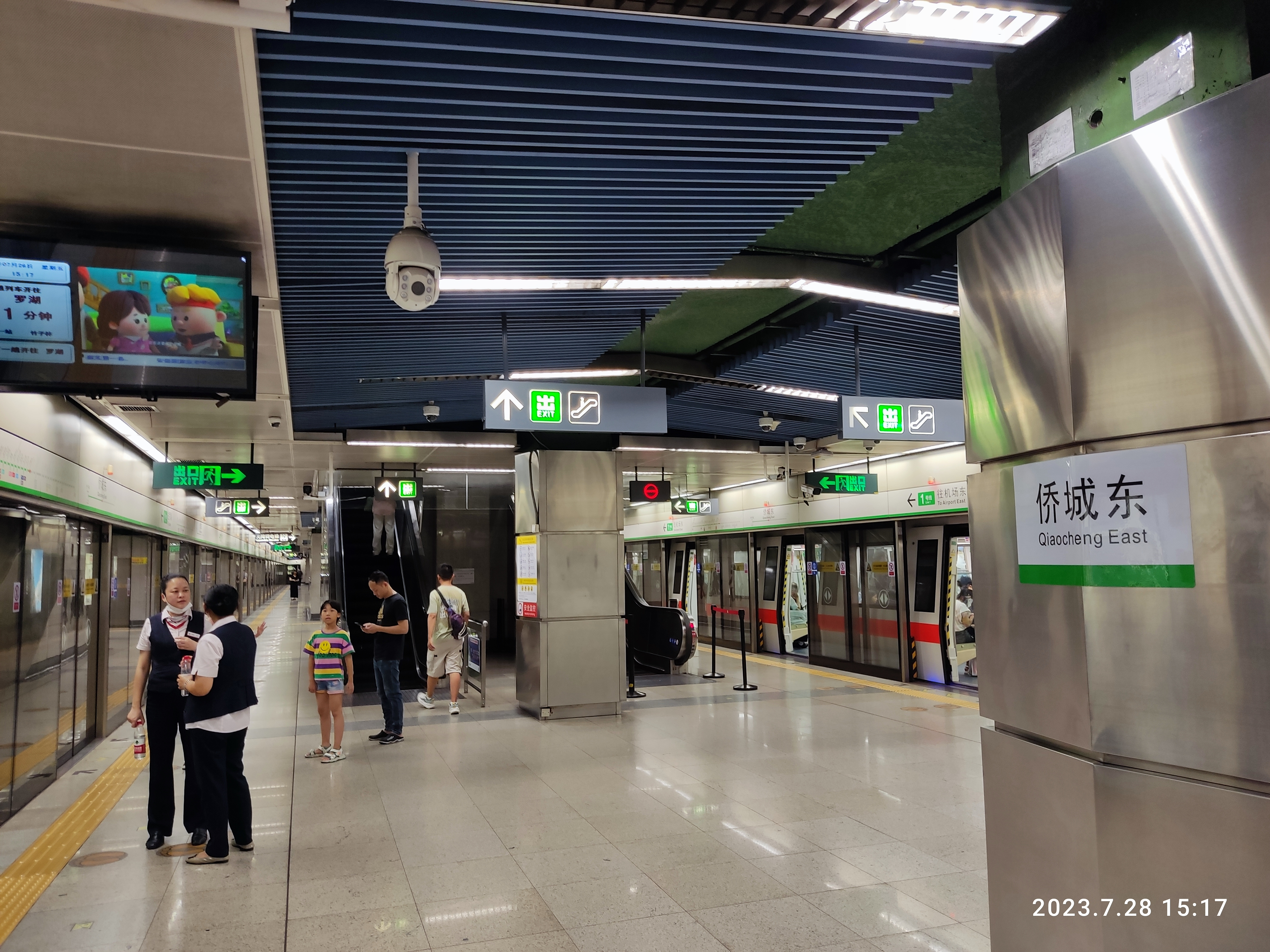
Platforms (2023)

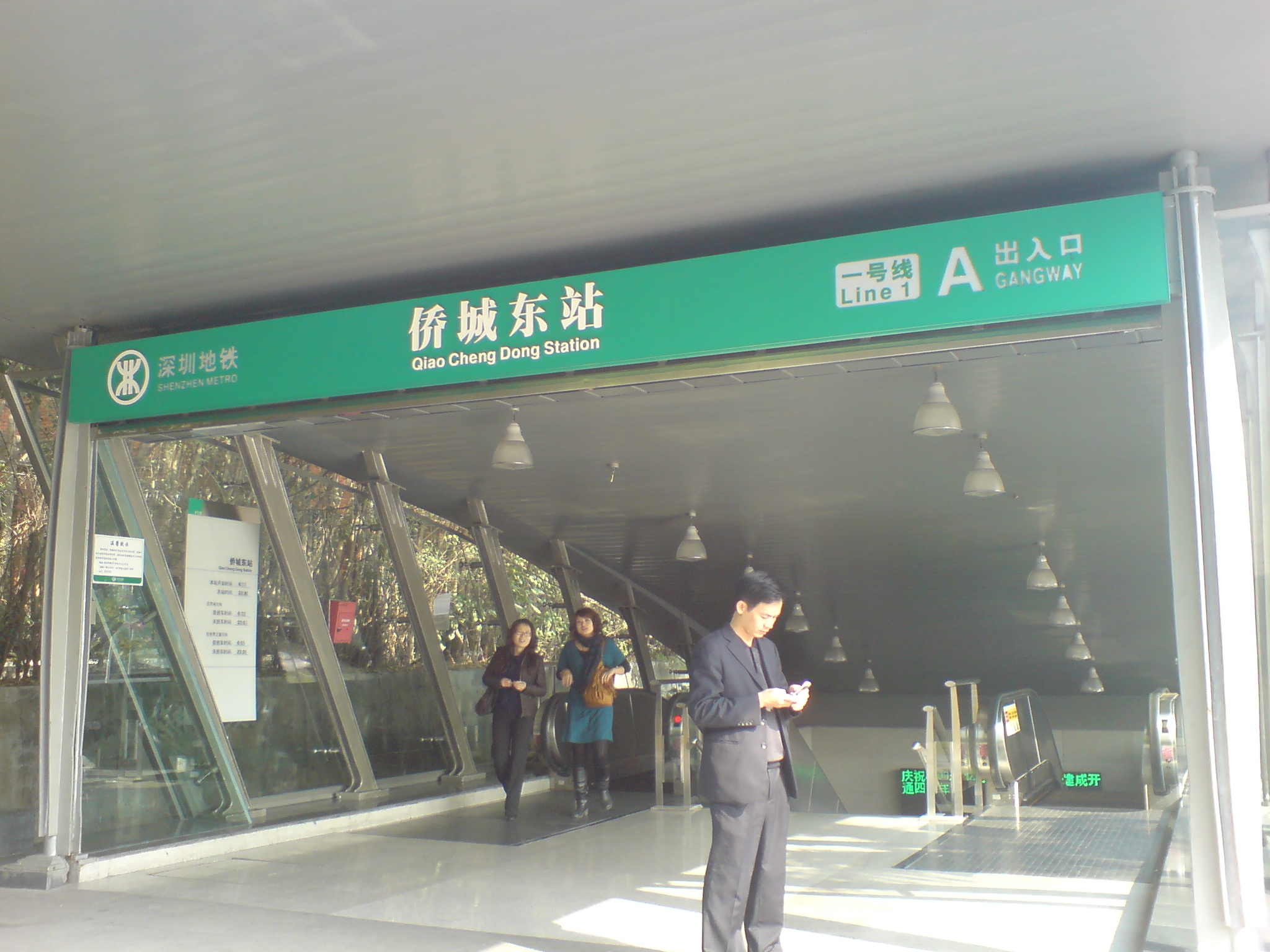
Gangway A (2009)

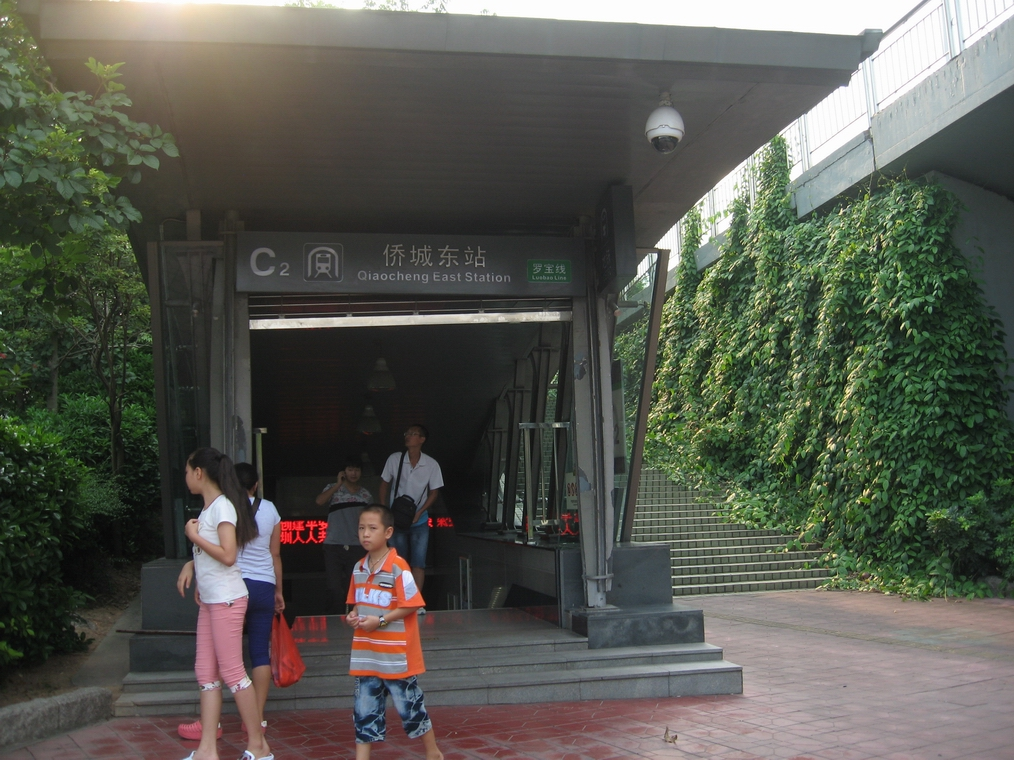
Exit C2 (2013)

== See also ==
- Overseas Chinese Town
