= OCT Tower =

Supertall skyscraper in Shenzhen, Guangdong, China

- 华侨城大厦
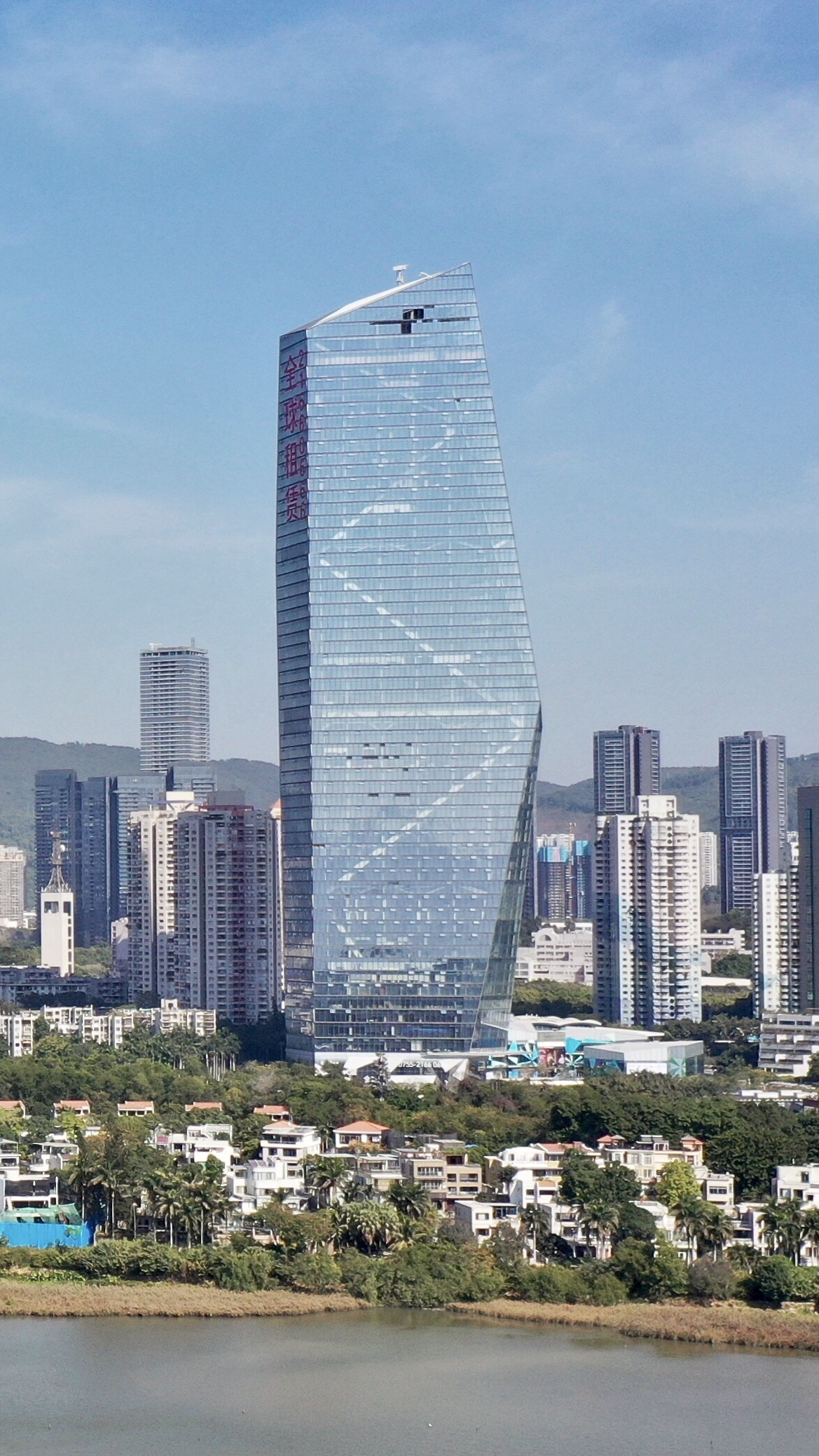
- OCT Tower in December 2020
- Interactive map of the OCT Tower area

General information
- Status: Completed
- Type: Office
- Architectural style: Modern
- Location: 9018 Shennan Boulevard, Nanshan District, Shenzhen, Guangdong, China
- Coordinates: 22°32′15″N 113°58′39″E
- Construction started: 2015
- Completed: 2020
- Cost: ¥2.1 billion (RMB, estimated)

Height
- Architectural: 300 m (984 ft)
- Tip: 300 m (984 ft)
- Top floor: 269.9 m (885 ft)

Technical details
- Floor count: 60 (+5 underground floors)
- Floor area: 215,973 m^{2} (2,324,714 sq ft)
- Lifts/elevators: 34

Design and construction
- Architect: Kohn Pedersen Fox
- Developer: Overseas Chinese Town Enterprises
- Structural engineer: Leslie E. Robertson
- Main contractor: China Construction Third Building Group

OCT Tower (Chinese: 华侨城大厦) is a skyscraper in Overseas Chinese Town, Shenzhen, China. It is 300 meters tall and has 60 floors. It is the 15th tallest building in Shenzhen. It functions as an office building. The building was first proposed in 2013 and construction started in 2015 and the building was finished in 2019. The architect was Kohn Pedersen Fox.

== See also ==
- List of tallest buildings in Shenzhen
- List of tallest buildings in China
- List of tallest buildings designed by Kohn Pedersen Fox
- Overseas Chinese Town
