= Hongshuwan station =

Metro station in Shenzhen, China

Coordinates: 22°31′30″N 113°58′5″E

Hongshuwan 红树湾
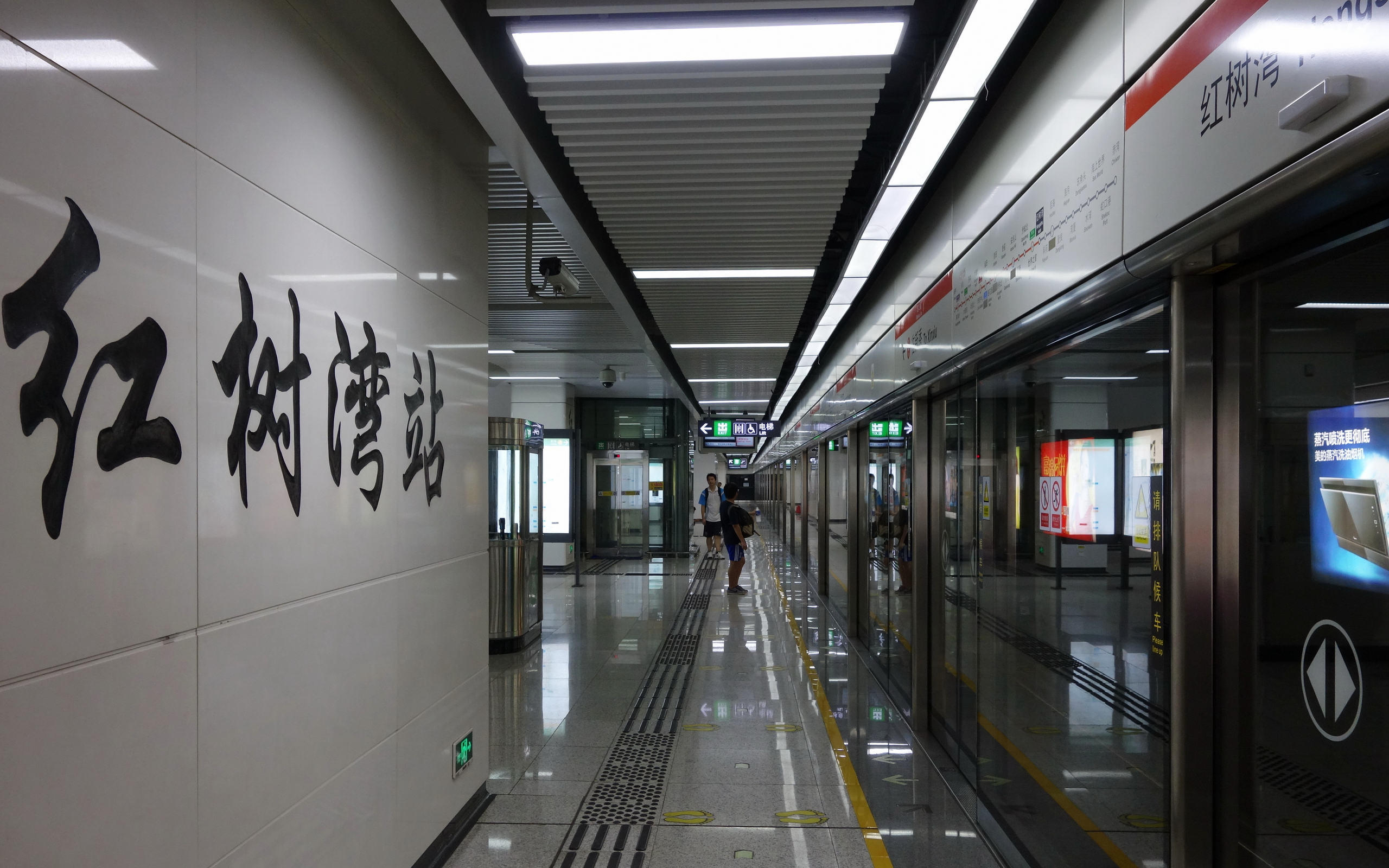

Chinese name
- Traditional Chinese: 紅樹灣
- Simplified Chinese: 红树湾
- Literal meaning: Red Tree Bay
Transcriptions
Standard Mandarin
- Hanyu Pinyin: Hóngshù Wān
Yue: Cantonese
- Jyutping: Hung4syu6 Waan1

General information
- Location: Nanshan District, Shenzhen, Guangdong; China
- Operator: SZMC (Shenzhen Metro Group)
- Line: Line 2
- Platforms: 2 (1 island platform)
- Tracks: 2

Construction
- Structure type: Underground
- Accessible: Yes

Other information
- Station code: 211

History
- Opened: 28 December 2010 (15 years ago)

Services
Preceding station	Shenzhen Metro	Following station
Keyuan towards Chiwan	Line 2	Window of the World towards Liantang (Line 8: Xichong)
Route map
Location

Hongshuwan station (simplified Chinese: 红树湾站; traditional Chinese: 紅樹灣站; pinyin: Hóngshùwān Zhàn; Jyutping: Hung4 Syu6 Waan1 Zaam6; lit. 'Red Tree Bay station') is a metro station on Line 2 of the Shenzhen Metro. It was opened on 28 December 2010.

== Station layout ==
G	-	Exit
B1F; Concourse	Lobby	Customer Service, Shops, Vending machines, ATMs
B2F; Platforms	Platform	← Line 2 towards Chiwan (Keyuan)
B2F; Platforms	Island platform, doors will open on the left
B2F; Platforms	Platform	Line 8 towards Xichong (Window of the World) →

== Exits ==
Exit	Destination
Exit A	Baishi 3rd Street (S), Shenwan 1st Road, Shenzhen Haibin Shiyan Primary School, Baishi 4th Street, Mangrove Nature Reserve, Mangrove West Coast
Exit B	Baishi 3rd Street (S)
Exit D	Baishi 3rd Street f(N), Shenwan 1st Road, Shahe Rainbow Department Store, Kingkey Banner Center, Citic Mangrove Bay
