= Qiaocheng North station =

Metro station in Shenzhen, Guangdong, China

Coordinates: 22°32′41″N 113°59′17″E

Qiaocheng North 侨城北
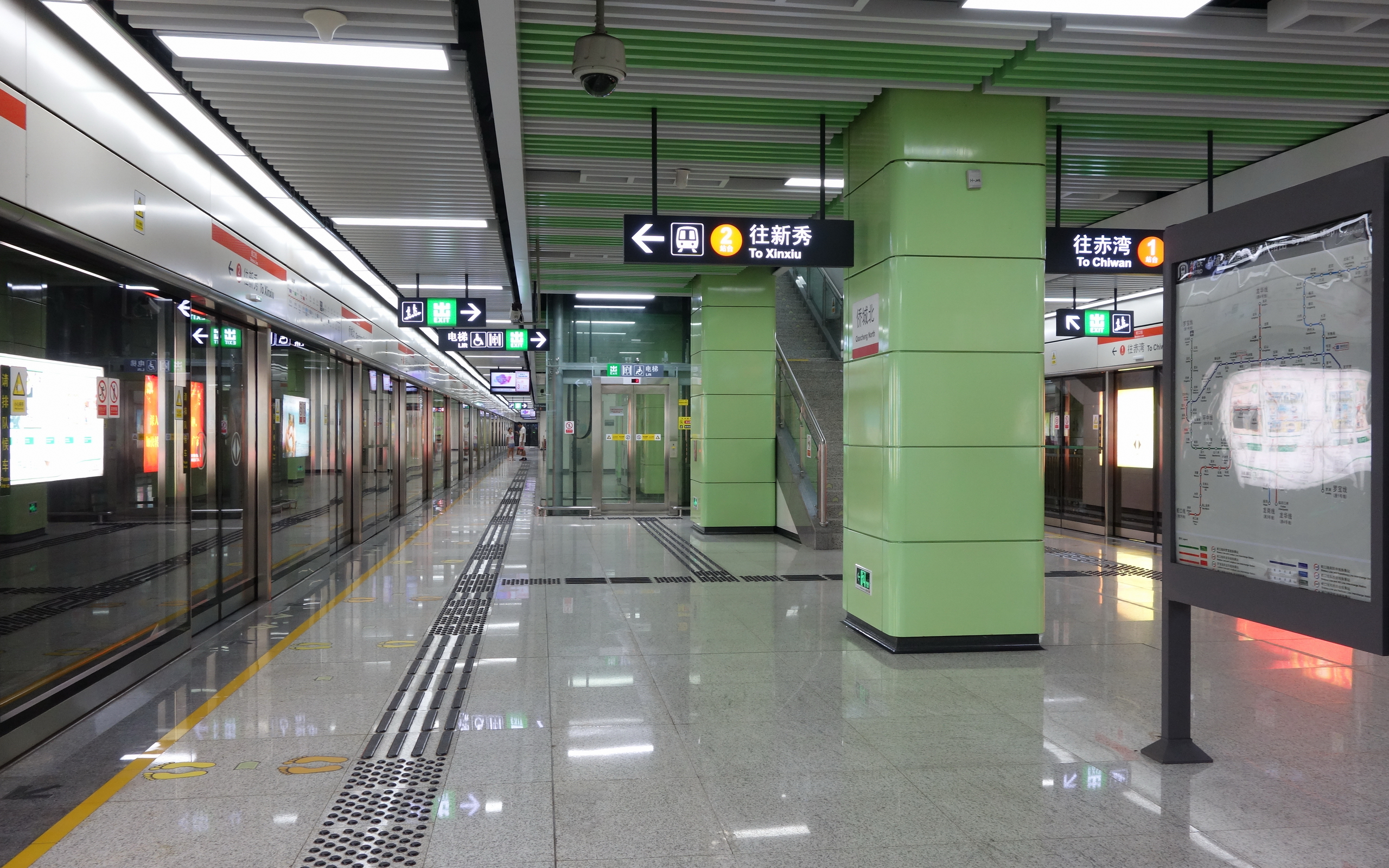

Chinese name
- Traditional Chinese: 僑城北
- Simplified Chinese: 侨城北
- Literal meaning: Overseas Chinese Town North
Transcriptions
Standard Mandarin
- Hanyu Pinyin: Qiáochéng Běi
Yue: Cantonese
- Jyutping: Kiu4 Sing4 Bak1

General information
- Location: Nanshan District, Shenzhen, Guangdong; China
- Operator: SZMC (Shenzhen Metro Group)
- Line: Line 2
- Platforms: 2 (1 island platform)
- Tracks: 2

Construction
- Structure type: Underground
- Accessible: Yes

Other information
- Station code: 213

History
- Opened: 28 June 2011 (15 years ago)

Services
Preceding station	Shenzhen Metro	Following station
Window of the World towards Chiwan	Line 2	Shenkang towards Liantang (Line 8: Xichong)
Route map
Location

Qiaocheng North station (simplified Chinese: 侨城北站; traditional Chinese: 僑城北站; pinyin: Qiáochéng Běi Zhàn; Jyutping: Kiu4 Sing4 Bak1 Zaam; lit. 'Overseas Chinese Town North station') is a station on Line 2 and Line 8 of the Shenzhen Metro. It opened on 28 June 2011.

== Station layout ==
G	-	Exit
B1F; Concourse	Lobby	Customer Service, Shops, Vending machines, ATMs
B2F; Platforms	Platform	← Line 2 towards Chiwan (Window of the World)
B2F; Platforms	Island platform, doors will open on the left
B2F; Platforms	Platform	Line 8 towards Xichong (Shenkang) →

== Exits ==
Exit	Destination
Exit B	Qiaocheng Road (S), Xiangshan East Street, OCT Hospital, Swan Castle
Exit C	Qiaoxiang Road (N), Shahe Zhonghang Industrial Area
Exit D	Qiaoxiang Road (N), Xiangnian Plaza, Wisdom Plaza, Shehe Jiangongcun
