= Window of the World =

Theme park in Shenzhen

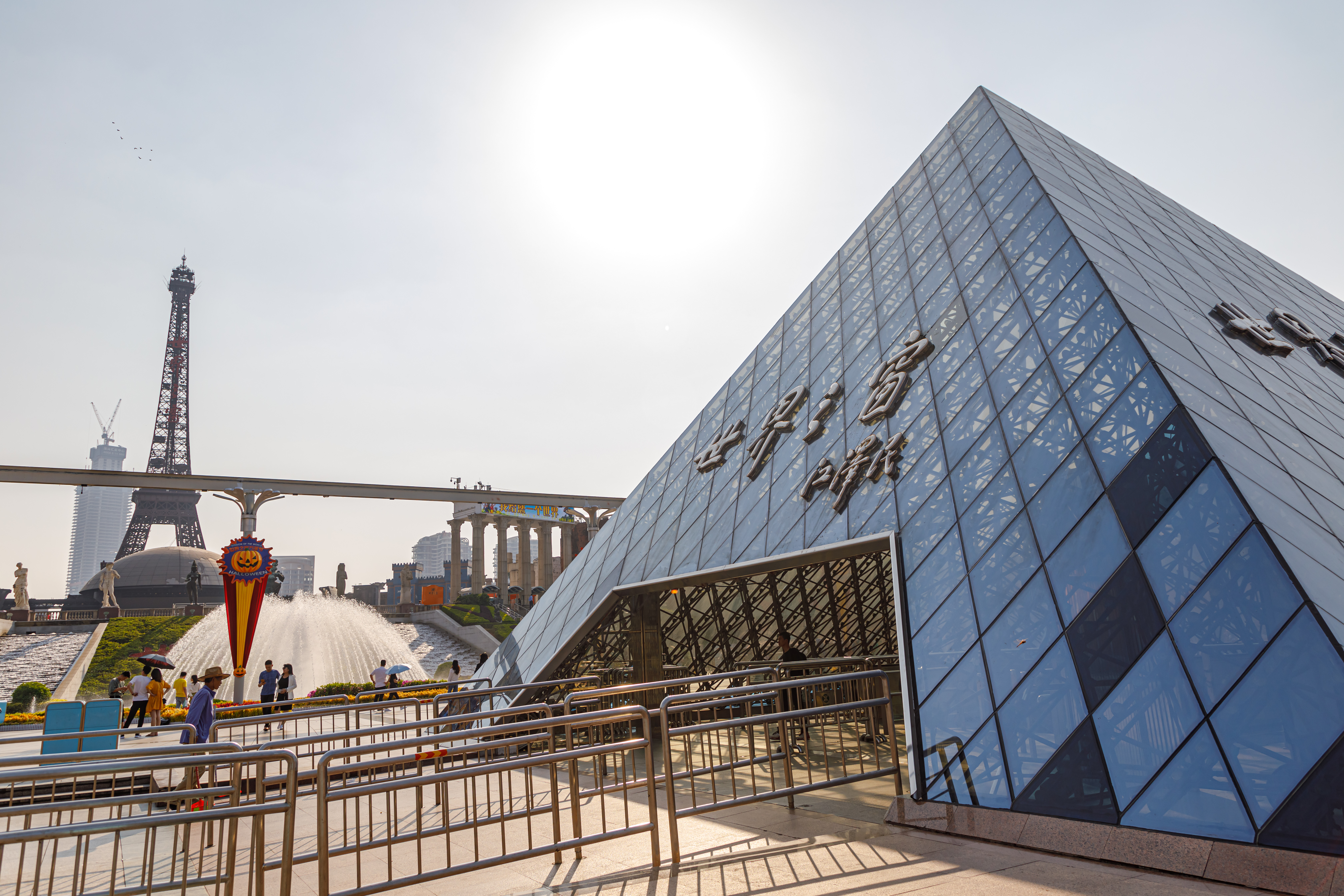
- Window of the World entrance with the Shenzhen Metro station in the right.
- Interactive map of Window of the World
- Location: Shenzhen, Guangdong, China
- Coordinates: 22°32′15.05″N 113°58′11.12″E
- Opened: 18 June 1994
- Owner: China Travel Service (Hong Kong) (51%); Overseas Chinese Town (49%)
- Theme: World landmarks

The Window of the World (Chinese: 世界之窗; pinyin: Shìjiè zhī Chuāng; Jyutping: sai3 gaai3 zi1 coeng1) is a theme park located in the city of Shenzhen in China. It has about 130 reproductions of world attractions and landmarks.

As of 2025, Window of the World is visited by more than 3.25 million tourists per year.

== History ==
Aerial view

The Window of the World in Shenzhen was developed as a theme park which primarily features replicas of famous world landmarks allowing mainland Chinese people to be able to witness these structure at the time overseas travel is relatively less accessible. It follows the concept of Splendid China, which features replications of tourist attractions and landmarks across China in one theme park in the same city.

It began construction in July 1991. The section where Eiffel Tower replica was completed by 1992. On June 18, 1994, the theme park was opened.

Initially a static attraction, the Window of the World introduced the water rides at the Grand Canyon and Niagara Falls replica. An indoor skiing venue meant to represent the Alps was opened in July 2000. It is China's first large-scale indoor skiing venue.

The Window of the World was designated a national 5A-level tourist attraction in 2007.

In June 2024, the dinosaur-themed water park, Jurassic Water World was opened.

== Attractions ==
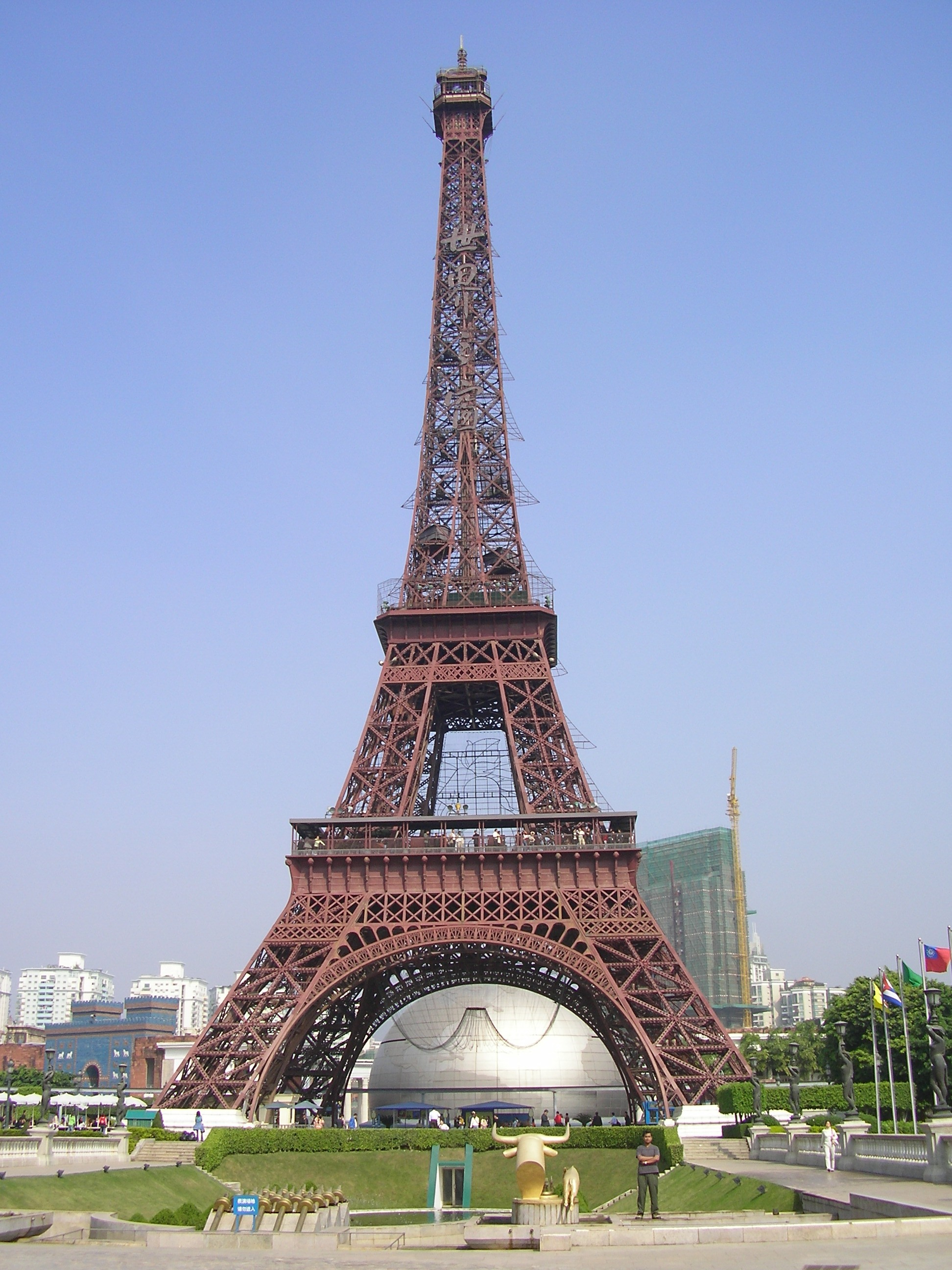
One-third scale replica of the Eiffel Tower

The Window of the World as of 2025, includes 130 scale landmarks from around the globe from a variety of historical eras and continents. The Global Square, the central feature of the park, features a one-third replica of the Eiffel Tower and stands 108 meters (354 ft) tall. Other replicas in the park include the Angkor Wat, Christ the Redeemer, pyramids of Giza, Sydney Opera House, and the Taj Mahal. It also features the Manhattan skyline and geographic landmarks such as Mount Fuji.

The Louvre Pyramid replica functions as the eponymous station (formerly Shijiezhichuang station) of the Shenzhen Metro.

Other attractions within the theme park include the indoor skiing venue operated by KK Park, and the dinosaur-themed Jurassic Water World water park.

== See also ==
- List of parks in Shenzhen
- Beijing World Park
- Grand World Scenic Park
- Tianducheng
- Hallstatt (China)
