= Window of the World station =

Metro station in Shenzhen, Guangdong, China

Coordinates: 22°32′13″N 113°58′28″E

Window of the World 世界之窗
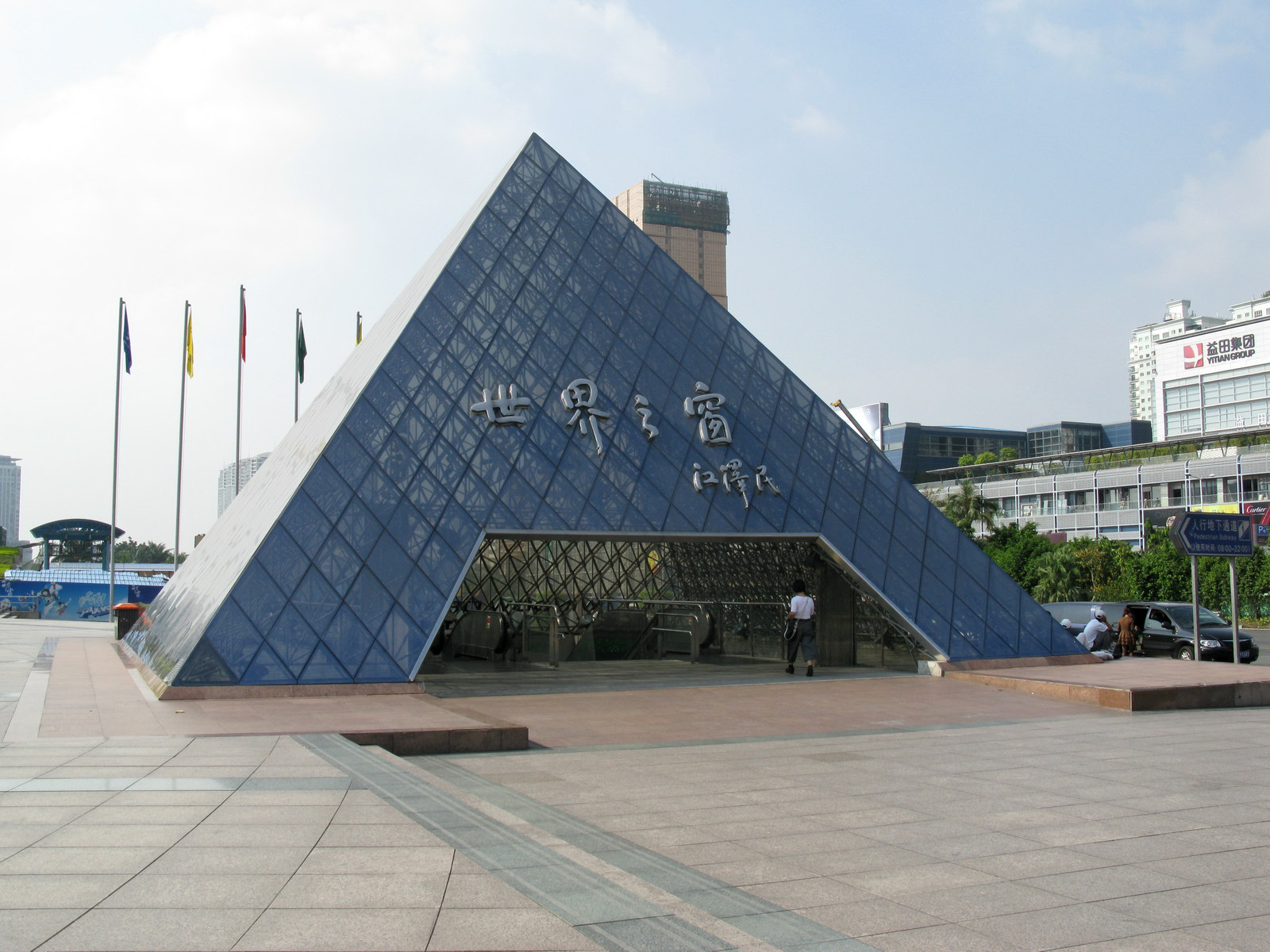
- Exit J, with calligraphy by Jiang Zemin

Chinese name
- Chinese: 世界之窗
Transcriptions
Standard Mandarin
- Hanyu Pinyin: Shìjiè Zhī Chuāng
Yue: Cantonese
- Jyutping: Sai3 Gaai3 Zi1 Coeng1

General information
- Other names: Shijiezhichuang
- Location: Nanshan District, Shenzhen, Guangdong; China
- Operated by: SZMC (Shenzhen Metro Group)
- Lines: Line 1; Line 2
- Platforms: 4 (2 side platforms and 1 island platform)
- Tracks: 4

Construction
- Structure type: Underground
- Accessible: Yes

Other information
- Station code: 116 (Line 1); 212 (Line 2)

History
- Opened: Line 1: 28 December 2004; 21 years ago Line 2: 28 December 2010; 15 years ago

Passengers
- 2015: 57,746 daily
- Rank: 8th of 118

Services
| Preceding station | Shenzhen Metro | Following station |
|---|---|---|
| Baishizhou towards Airport East | Line 1 | OCT towards Luohu |
| Hongshuwan towards Chiwan | Line 2 | Qiaocheng North towards Liantang (Line 8: Xichong) |
Route map
Location

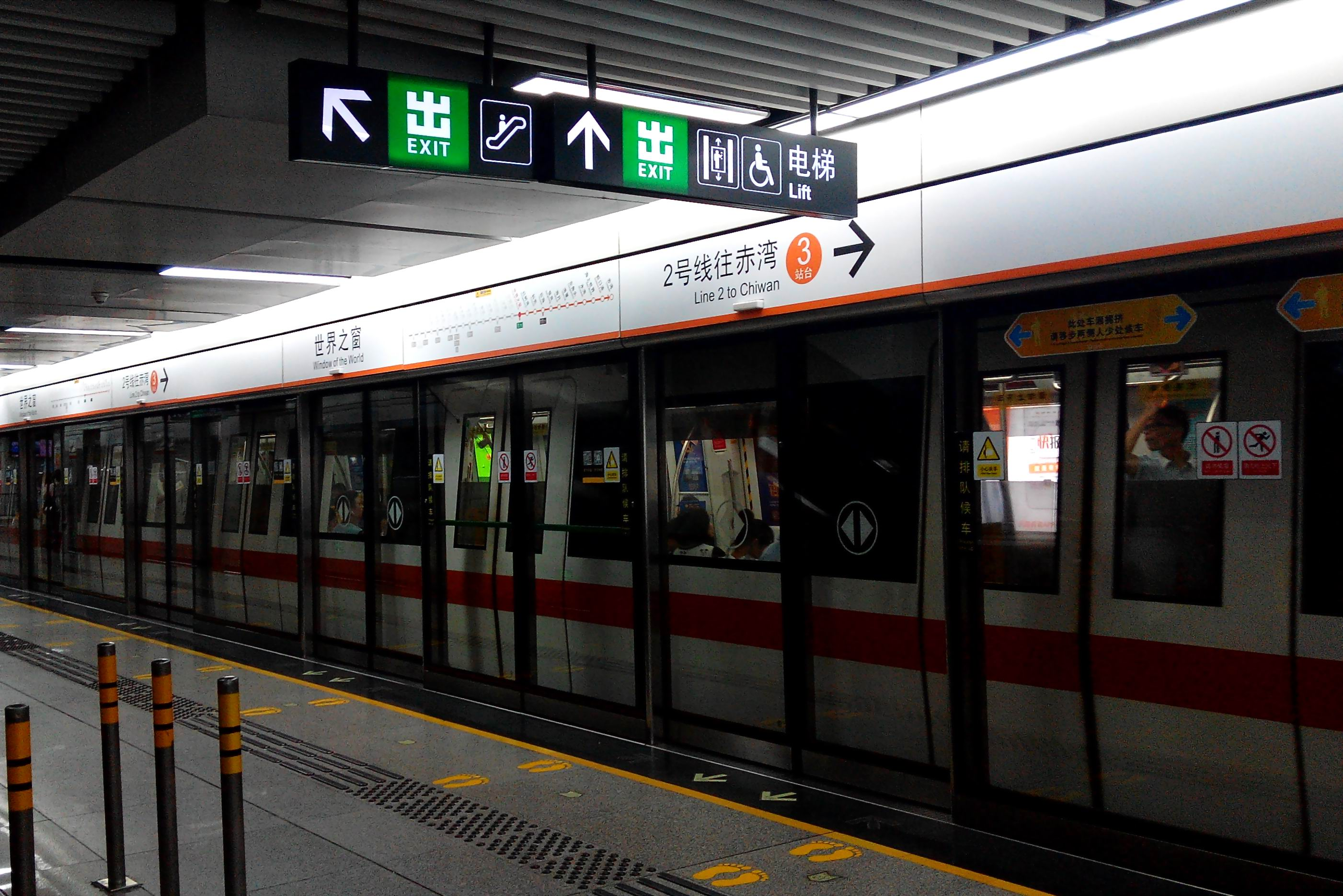
Line 2 platform

Window of the World station (Chinese: 世界之窗站; pinyin: Shìjièzhīchuāng Zhàn; Jyutping: Sai3 Gaai3 Zi1 Coeng1 Zaam6), formerly Shijiezhichuang station is a station on Line 1 and Line 2 of the Shenzhen Metro. The Line 1 platforms opened on 28 December 2004 and the Line 2 platforms opened on 28 December 2010 as the terminus. It is located underground at the north of Window of the World in Shennan Dadao, Nanshan District, Shenzhen, China. It provides access to two of the theme parks in Shenzhen, Window of the World and Happy Valley.

== Station layout ==
| G | - | Exit |
| B1F; Concourse | Lobby | Customer Service, Shops, Vending machines, ATMs |
| B2F; Platforms | Platform 1 | ← Line 1 towards Airport East (Baishizhou) |
| B2F; Platforms | Island platform, doors will open on the left |
| B2F; Platforms | Platform 2 | Line 1 towards Luohu (Overseas Chinese Town) → |
| B3F; Platforms | Side platform, doors will open on the right |
| B3F; Platforms | Platform 3 | ← Line 2 towards Chiwan (Hongshuwan) |
| B3F; Platforms | Platform 4 | Line 8 towards Xichong (Qiaocheng North) → |
| B3F; Platforms | Side platform, doors will open on the right |

== Exits ==
| Exit | | Destination |
|---|---|---|
| Exit A | | Shennan Boulevard (N), To Nanshan, Bao’an, Qiaocheng West Street, Happy Valley, Holiday Plaza, City Inn Happy Valley, Crowne Plaza Shenzhen, The Westin Shenzhen Nanshan |
| Exit B | | Shennan Boulevard (N), Holiday Plaza |
| Exit C | C | Shennan Boulevard (N), To Nanshan, Bao’an, Shahe Primary School, Baishizhou, Baishizhou Long-distance Bus Station, Shenzhen Shahe Hospital, Bus Transfer Station |
| Exit C | C1 | Shennan Boulevard (N) |
| Exit H | H | Shennan Boulevard (S), Baishizhou, Bus Transfer Station |
| Exit H | H1 | Shennan Boulevard (S), Window of the World car park |
| Exit I | | Shennan Boulevard (S), Carnival Square, Window of the World car park |
| Exit J | | Shennan Boulevard (S), Window of the World pyramid |
| Exit K | | Window of the World square |
| Exit L | | Holiday Plaza |
