= China Folk Culture Village =

Folk museum in Shenzhen, China

- Simplified Chinese: 深圳中国民俗文化村
- Traditional Chinese: 深圳中國民俗文化村
Transcriptions
Standard Mandarin
- Hanyu Pinyin: Shēnzhèn Zhōngguó Mínsú Wénhuà Cūn
Yue: Cantonese
- Jyutping: sam1 zan3 zung1 gwok3 man4 zuk6 man4 faa3 cyun1

The China Folk Culture Village (深圳中国民俗文化村) is a part of Splendid China Folk Village in Shenzhen, China. It is located adjacent to the Splendid China theme park and features displays of the daily life and architecture of 56 Chinese ethnic groups. It was opened to the public in October 1991.

== Villages ==
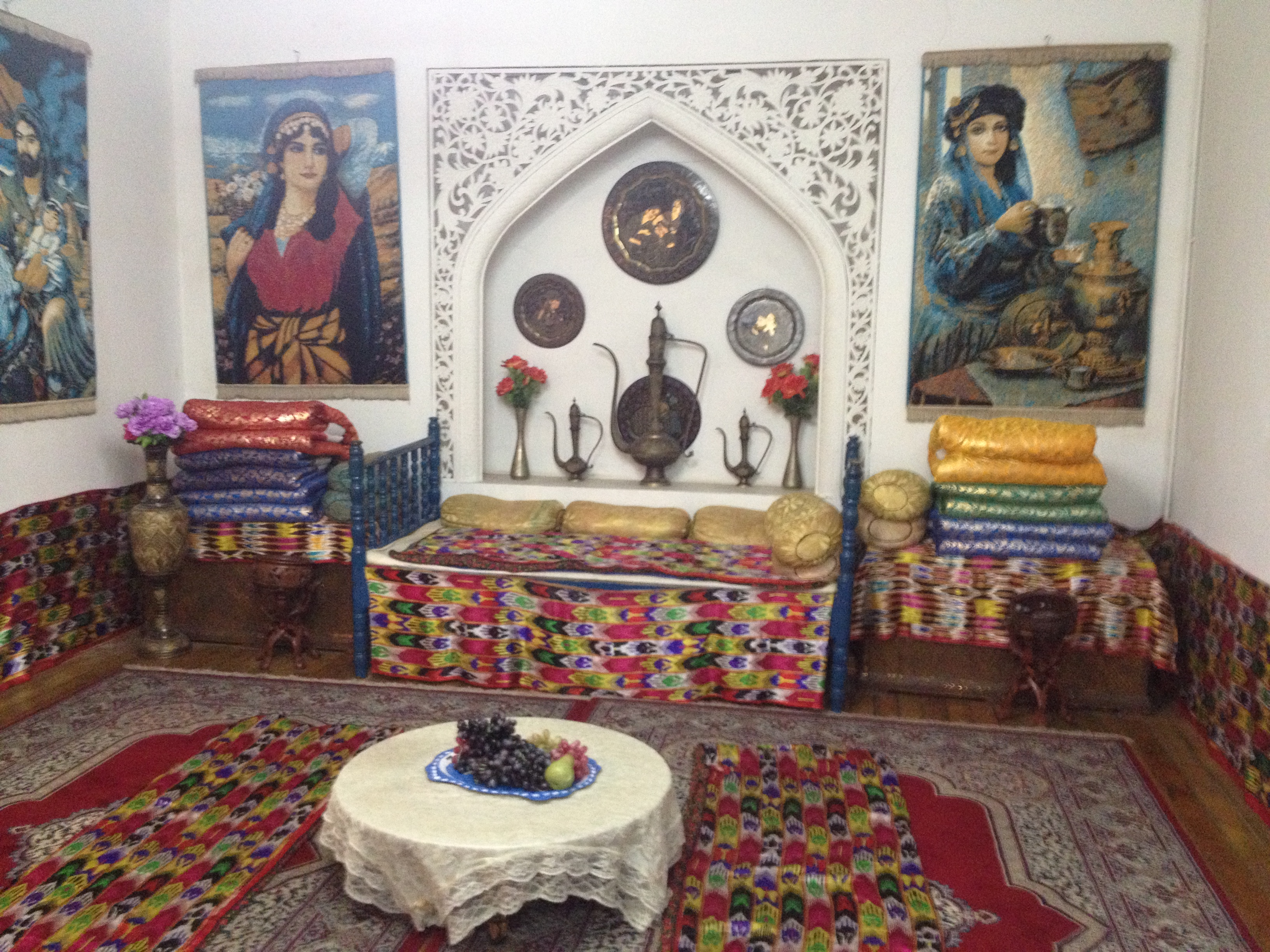
Uyghur house

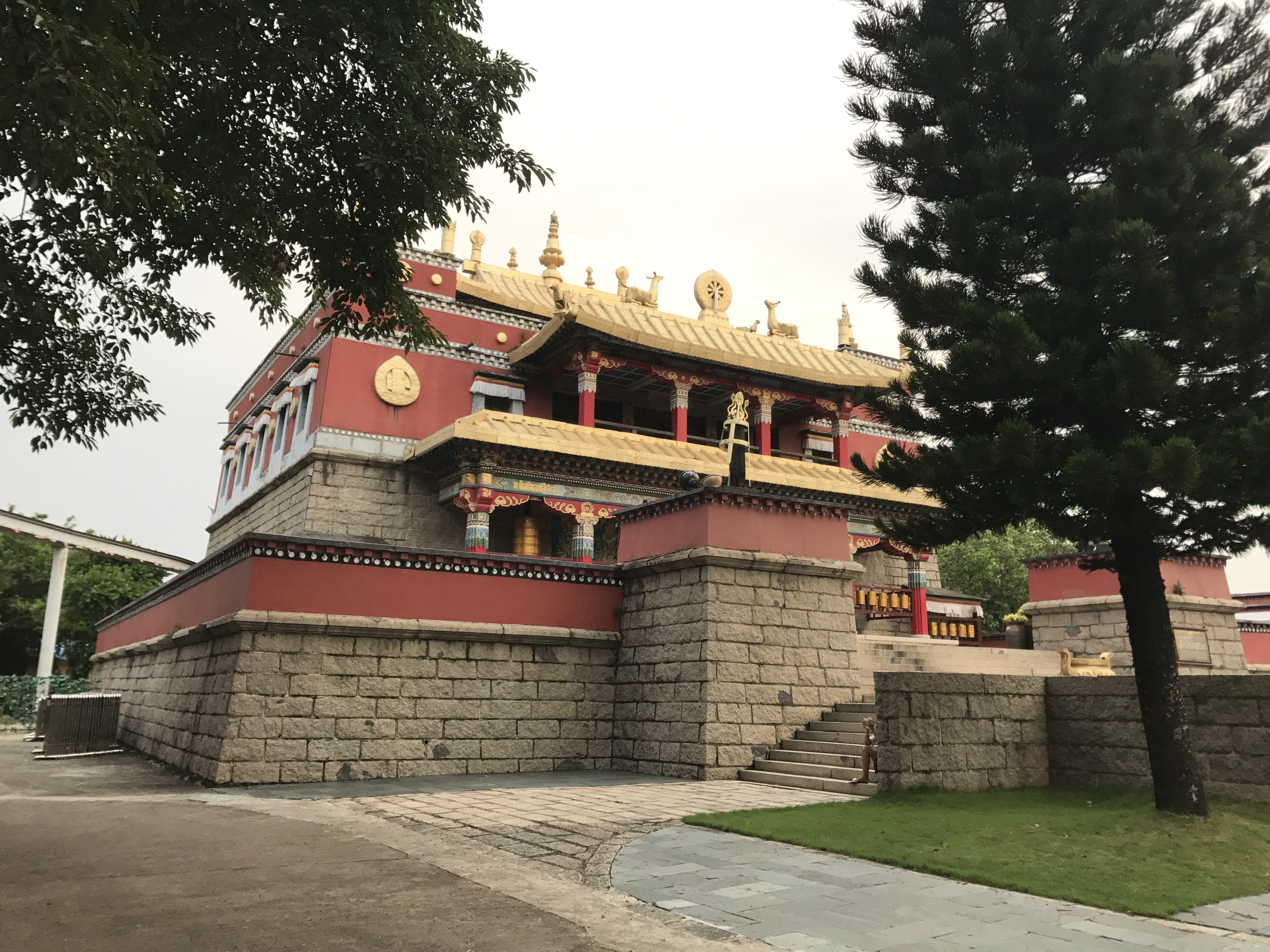
Tibetan temple

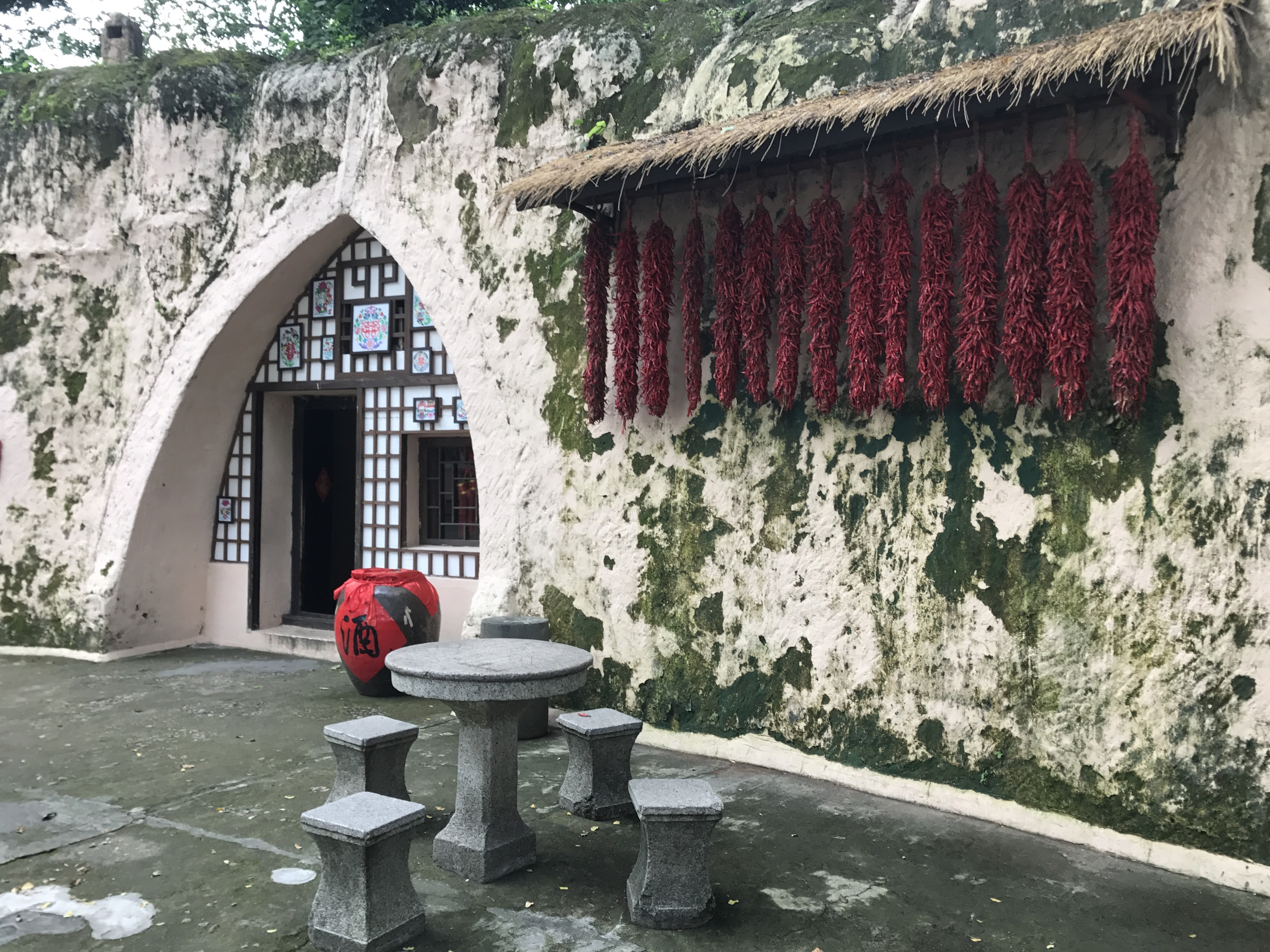
Cave-house

The China Folk Cultural Village has locations themed for the ethnic minorities of China. The park's recreated villages include the following:

- Yi Village
- Miao Village
- Dong Village
- Naxi Village
- Buyi Village
- Yao Village
- Zhuang Village
- Mosuo Village
- Dai Village
- Wa Village
- Hani Village
- Gaoshan Village
- Bai Village
- Li Village
- Jingpo Village
- Tibetan Nationality
- Uyghur Nationality
- Quadrate Yard
- Mongolian Nationality
- Korean Nationality
- Cave-house in North Shaanxi
- Tujia Village

== Festivals ==
The China Folk Culture Village has featured several cultural festivals, including the Water Splashing Festival of the Dai, the Shawm Festival of the Miao, the Torch Festival of the Yi, the Huaxia Great Cultural Temple Fair, the Xinjiang Cultural Festival, and the Inner Mongolia Grassland Cultural Festival.

== History ==
Deng Xiaoping visited the China Folk Culture Village during his 1992 southern tour. A photographs of Deng taken by Malaysian Chinese tourists during his visit was published in a Hong Kong newspaper the next day and became the first public record of the southern tour.

== See also ==
- China Nationalities Museum
- Vietnam Museum of Ethnology
- List of parks in Shenzhen
