= Splendid China Folk Village =

Chinese theme park

Coordinates: 22°32′06″N 113°59′01″E

- Simplified Chinese: 锦绣中华民俗村
- Traditional Chinese: 錦繡中華民俗村
Transcriptions
Standard Mandarin
- Hanyu Pinyin: Jǐnxiù Zhōnghuá Mínsú Cūn
Yue: Cantonese
- Jyutping: gam2 sau3 zung1 waa4 man4 zuk6 cyun1

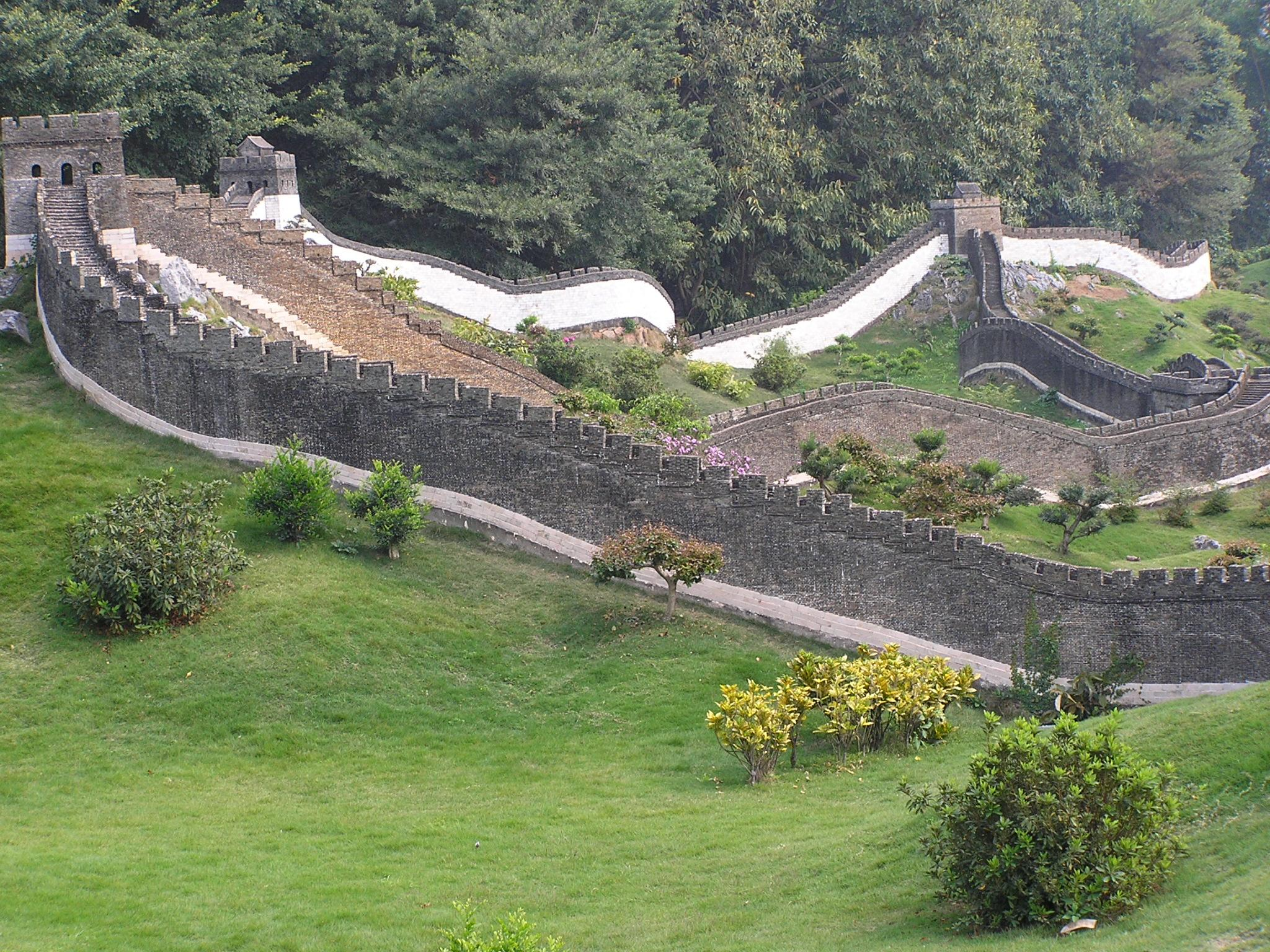
Miniature of the Great Wall of China

Splendid China Folk Village (Chinese: 锦绣中华民俗村, pinyin: Jǐnxiù Zhōnghuá Mínsú Cūn) is a theme park including two areas (Splendid China Miniature Park and China Folk Culture Village) located in Shenzhen, China. The park's theme reflects the history, culture, art, ancient architecture, customs and habits of the 56 ethnic groups of China.

It is one of the world's largest scenery parks in the amount of scenarios reproduced. The park is developed and managed by the major travel and tourist corporation China Travel Service.

Asteroid 3088 Jinxiuzhonghua is named after the park.

== Location ==
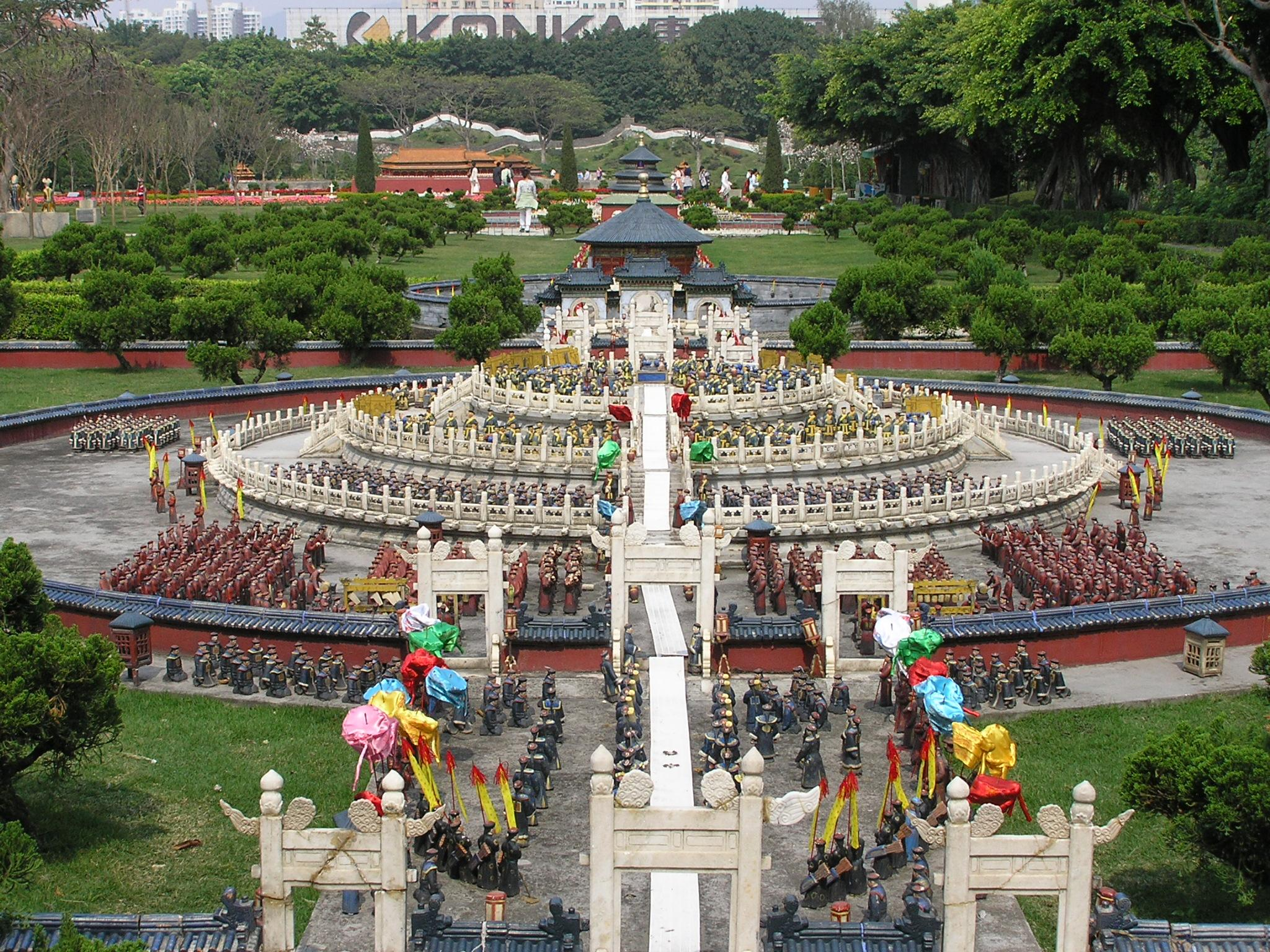
Miniature of the Temple of Heaven

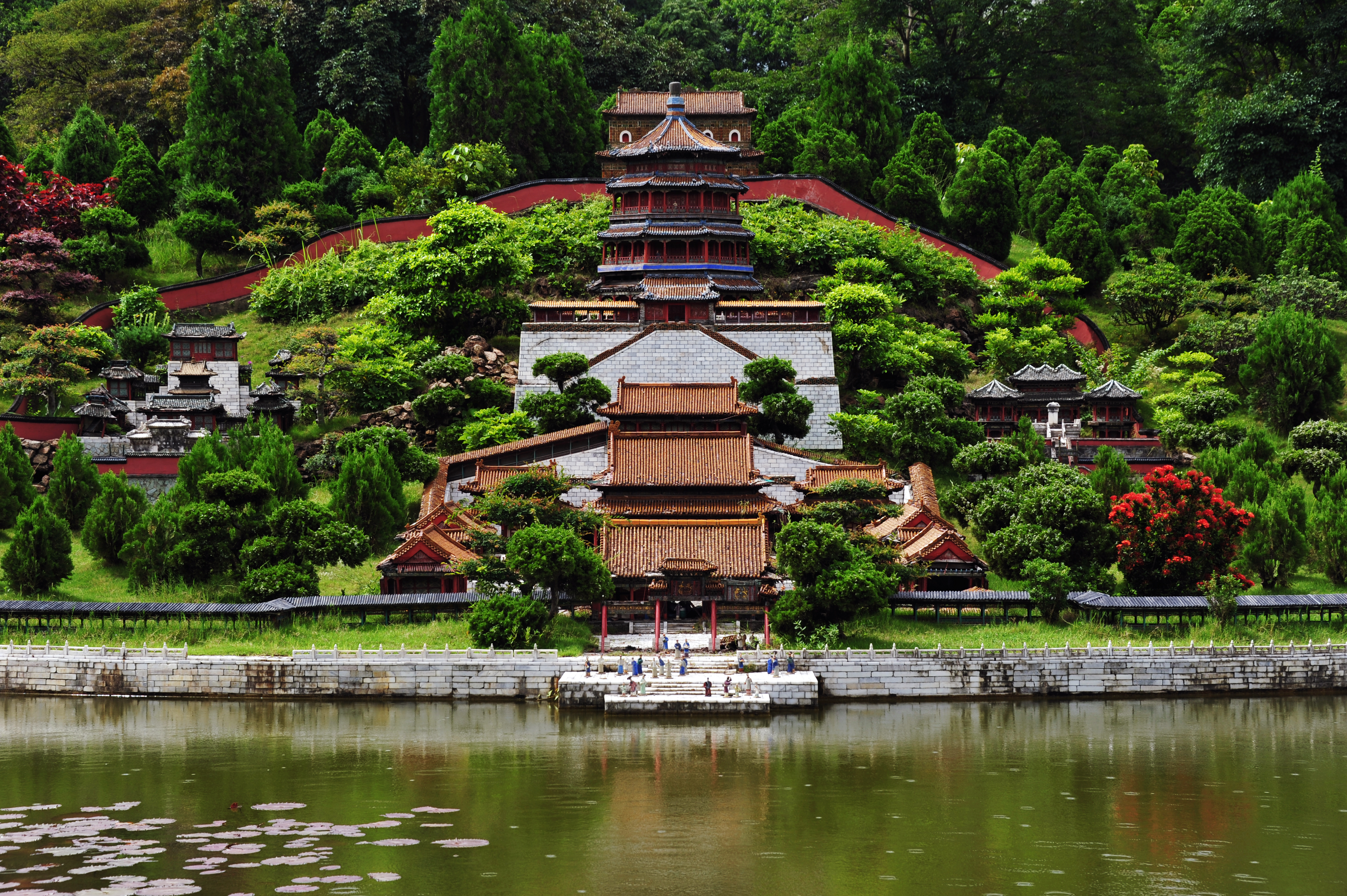
Miniature of the Summer Palace

Splendid China is situated by the Shenzhen Bay in a tourist area of Overseas Chinese Town (OCT) in the Shenzhen Special Economic Zone. It is a 35-40 minute train ride from Luohu Station on Line 1 of the Shenzhen Metro or 30 minutes by bus (bus number 101 or mini-bus 23 are two examples).

== Attractions ==
Over 100 major tourist attractions have been miniaturized and laid out according to the map of China. Most attractions have been reduced on a scale of 1:15. It is divided into Scenic Spot Area and Comprehensive Service Area. The entire park covers 30 hectares.

There are cars and trains to speedily transport visitors around the vast park. The park features models of the Great Wall of China, Forbidden City, Temple of Heaven, Summer Palace, Three Gorges Dam, Potala Palace and the Terracotta Army.

The park also hosts several shows depicting various events in Chinese history (e.g. a horse riding show depicting a battle led by Genghis Khan).

== See also ==
- List of parks in Shenzhen
