= 2020 in amusement parks =

This is a list of events and openings related to amusement parks that occurred in 2020. These various lists are not exhaustive. Due to the COVID-19 pandemic, some of the things that happened here were either canceled or moved to the following years.

== Amusement parks ==
=== Opening ===
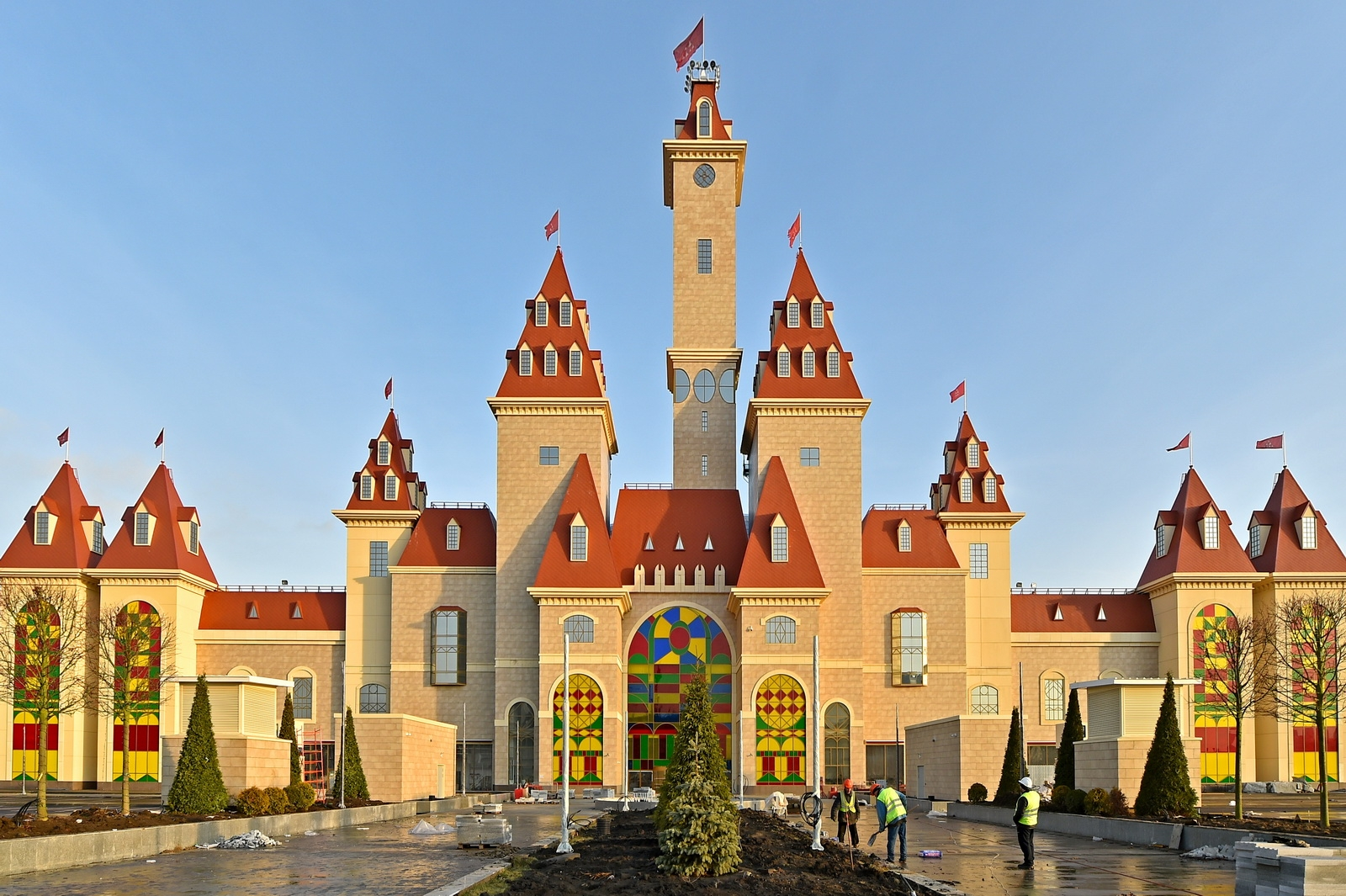
Dream Island Moscow opened in February.

- Switzerland Ticiland - October 10
- China Smurfs Theme Park
- China Ocean Paradise
- China World Fairytale Land
- Indonesia Transmart Jambi
- Qatar Doha Oasis (Wonder Dome)
- Russia Dream Island Moscow – February 29
- U.S. DreamWorks Water Park in American Dream Meadowlands – October 1
- U.S. Legoland Discovery Centre in American Dream Meadowlands – March 2020
- China Suzhou Paradise Forest World
- China Ocean Paradise
- China Hot Go Dreamworld
- China Daqingshan Wildlife Park - January 1
- China Visionland Dingcheng - January 18
- Indonesia Banyuwangi Park - May 2020

=== Change of name ===
- Canada Galaxyland » Galaxyland powered by Hasbro
- U.S. White Water Bay (Oklahoma) » Six Flags Hurricane Harbor Oklahoma City
- U.S. Magic Waters » Six Flags Hurricane Harbor Rockford
- Vietnam Vinpearl Land, Kiên Giang » VinWonders, Kiên Giang
- Vietnam Vinpearl Land, Khánh Hòa » VinWonders, Khánh Hòa
- Vietnam Vinpearl Land, Quảng Nam » VinWonders, Quảng Nam

=== Change of ownership ===
- U.S. Indiana Beach – Apex Parks Group » Indiana Beach Holdings, LLC (now known as IB Parks & Entertainment)
- England Drayton Manor Theme Park – The Bryan Family » Looping Group

=== Birthday ===
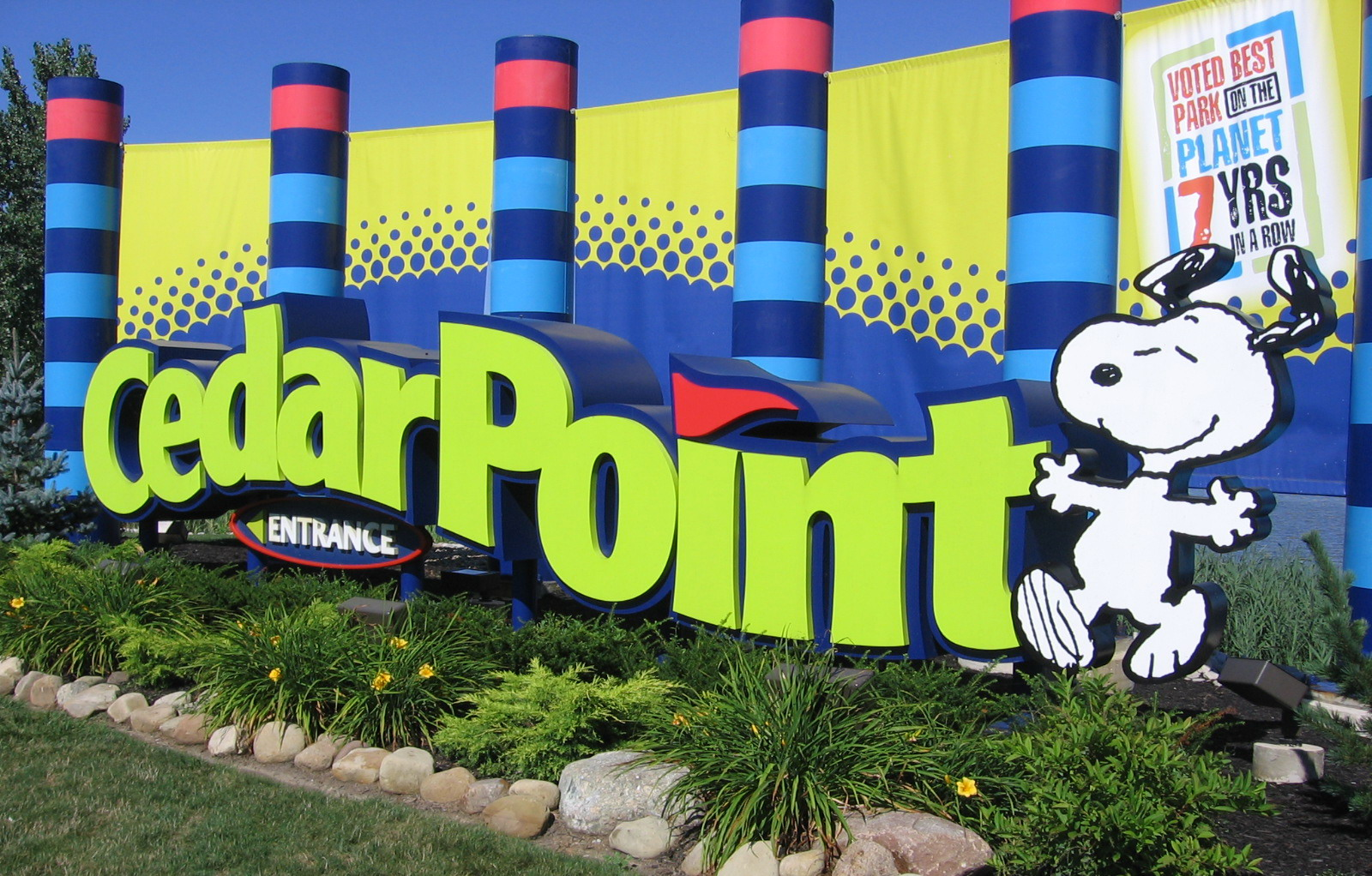
Cedar Point celebrated its 150th anniversary.

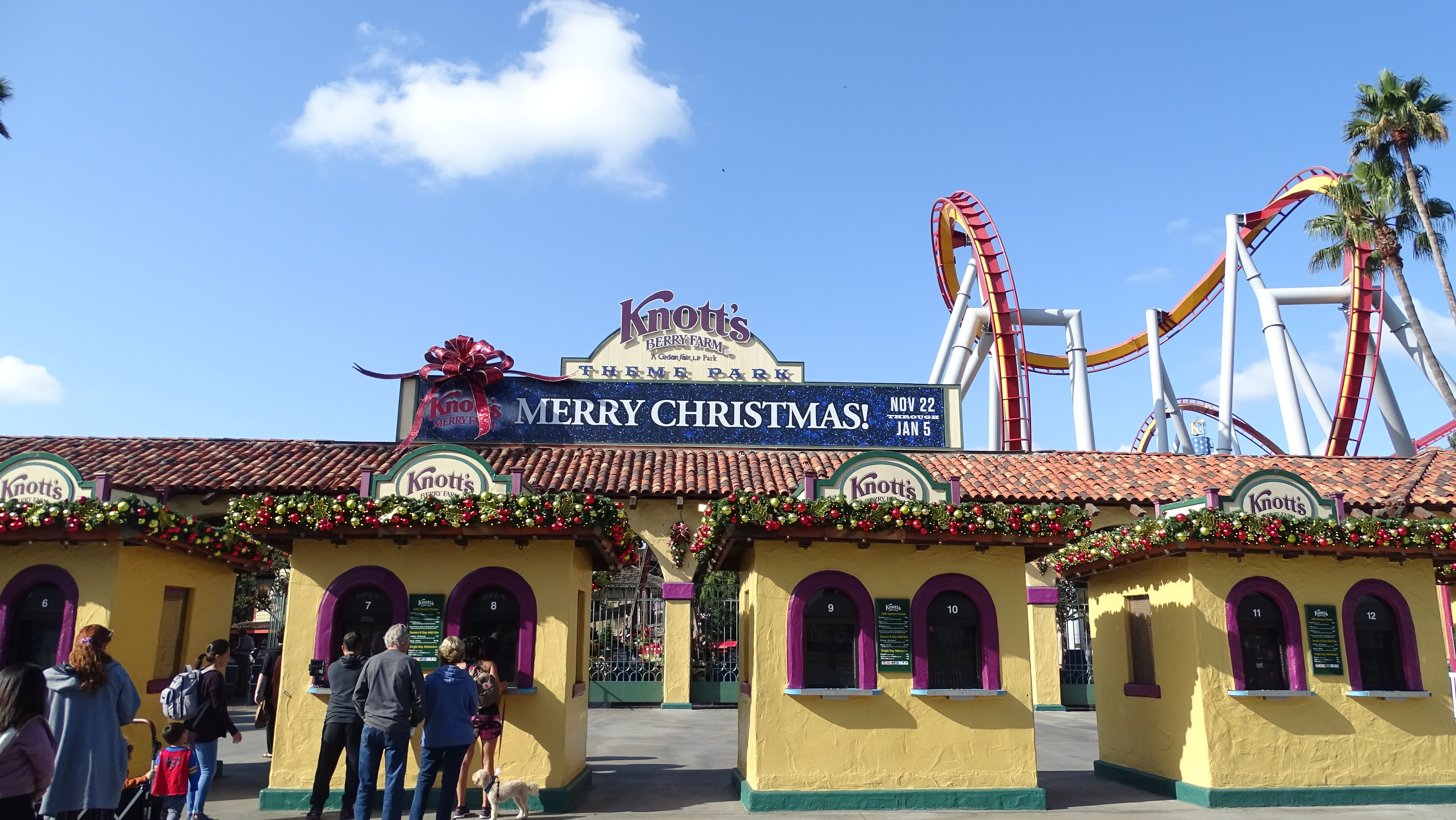
Knott's Berry Farm celebrated its centenary year in 2020.

- Alton Towers - 40th birthday
- Busch Gardens Williamsburg - 45th birthday
- Cedar Point - 150th anniversary
- Disneyland - 65th birthday
- Drayton Manor - 70th birthday
- Europa Park - 45th birthday
- Gardaland - 45th birthday
- Knott's Berry Farm - 100th anniversary
- Luna Park Sydney - 85th birthday
- Mt. Olympus Water & Theme Park - 30th birthday
- PortAventura World - 25th anniversary
- Sesame Place - 40th birthday
- Silver Dollar City - 60th anniversary
- Six Flags New England - 150th birthday
- Universal Studios Florida - 30th birthday
- Walibi Belgium - 45th birthday

=== Closed ===
All parks that are not listed here closed beginning in March due to the COVID-19 pandemic and did not reopen.

- Tokyo One Piece Tower – July 31
- Misaki Park – March 31
- Toshimaen – August 31
- Boomers! Houston – February 2020
- Boomers! El Cajon – June 8
- Boomers! San Diego – June 8
- Boomers! Fountain Valley – June 8
- Boomers! Upland – June 8
- Holy Land Experience – March 14
- Wild River Country – planned to open for 2020 but could not and never reopened afterwards

== Additions ==
=== Roller coasters ===
==== New ====
| Name | Park | Type | Manufacturer | Opened | Ref(s) |
|---|---|---|---|---|---|
| Achterbahn | Ticiland | Family roller coaster | Zierer | October 10 | |
| Canavar Dalga | Wonderland Eurasia | Family Launched roller coaster | Intamin | 2020 | |
| Candymonium | Hersheypark | Steel roller coaster | Bolliger & Mabillard | July 3 | |
| Çelik Kartal | Wonderland Eurasia | Suspended Junior roller Coaster | Zamperla | 2020 | |
| Cinderella Coaster | Storybook Land | Spinning roller coaster | SBF Visa Group | 2020 | |
| Draken | Furuviksparken | Family roller coaster | Zierer | May 16 | |
| DUPLO Dino Coaster | Legoland Windsor | Junior roller Coaster | Mack Rides | March 14 | |
| Eleventh Roller Coaster | Great Xingdong Tourist World | Steel roller coaster | Hebei Zhongye | 2020 | |
| Erdbeer Raupenbahn | Karls Erlebnis-Dorf Koserow | Family roller coaster | SBF Visa Group | May 30 | |
| Erdbeer Raupenbahn | Karls Erlebnis-Dorf Zirkow | Family roller coaster | SBF Visa Group | May 29 | |
| Eagle Warriors | VinWonders, Kiên Giang | Suspended Family Coaster | Vekoma | 2020 | |
| Euro Coaster | Wiener Prater | Gliding Coaster | Reverchon | May 29 | |
| F.L.Y. | Phantasialand | Flying roller coaster | Vekoma | September 17 | |
| Frank' N Coaster | House of Frankenstein Niagara Falls | Steel Family roller coaster | Wisdom Rides | July 13 | |
| GP Racers | Suzuka Circuit | Dueling roller coaster | Hoei Sangyo Co., Ltd. | March 1 | |
| Girdap Sörfçüler | Wonderland Eurasia | Steel roller coaster | Interpark | 2020 | |
| Hals-über-Kopf | Erlebnispark Tripsdrill | Suspended Thrill Coaster | Vekoma | June 26 | |
| Hummel Brummel | Schwaben Park | Wie-Flyer | Wiegand | August 15 | |
| Launch Coaster | Sun Tzu Cultural Park | Steel Launched roller coaster | S&S - Sansei Technologies | August 23 | |
| Max & Moritz | Efteling | Steel Powered roller coaster | Mack Rides | June 20 | |
| Miğfer | Wonderland Eurasia | Steel roller coaster | SBF Visa Group | 2020 | |
| Mine Roller Coaster | Great Xingdong Tourist World | Mine train roller coaster | Golden Horse | 2020 | |
| Mouse Coaster | Wonderland Eurasia | Spinning Wild Mouse roller coaster | Levent Lunapark | 2020 | |
| Noisette Express | Nigloland | Junior roller Coaster | ART Engineering GmbH | July 11 | |
| Objectif Mars | Futuroscope | Spinning Launched roller coaster | Intamin | June 13 | |
| Orion | Kings Island | Steel roller coaster | Bolliger & Mabillard | July 12 | |
| Öksökö Öfkesi | Wonderland Eurasia | Steel roller coaster | Beijing Shibaolai Amusement Equipment | 2020 | |
| Power Mouse Coaster | Wonderland Eurasia | Spinning Wild Mouse roller coaster | Fabbri Group | 2020 | |
| Race of the Future | Dream Island Moscow | Spinning Wild Mouse roller coaster | Fabbri Group | 2020 | |
| Roller Ball | Wiener Prater | Roller Ball | Ride Engineers Switzerland | June 13 | |
| Sandy's Blasting Bronco | Nickelodeon Universe In American Dream Meadowlands | Steel Launched roller coaster | Intamin | October 1 | |
| Saven | Fårup Summer Park | Family Boomerang | Vekoma | 2020 | |
| Smurfberry Roller Coaster | Smurfs Theme Park | Junior Spinning roller coaster | Beijing North Rongda Amusement Equipment Co., Ltd | 2020 | |
| Texas Stingray | SeaWorld San Antonio | Wooden roller coaster | Great Coasters International | February 22 | |
| Tsunami | Scene75 Entertainment Center - Dayton | Spinning roller coaster | SBF Visa Group | October 2020 | |
| Shred The Sewers | Dream Island Moscow | Launched roller coaster | Intamin | July 18 | |
| Uzaya Yolculuk | Wonderland Eurasia | Steel roller coaster | Beijing Shibaolai Amusement Equipment | 2020 | |
| Volldampf | Erlebnispark Tripsdrill | Family Boomerang | Vekoma | June 26 | |
| Vertika | La Récré des 3 Curés | Euro-Fighter roller coaster | Gerstlauer | June 6 | |
| Wakala | Bellewaerde | Family roller coaster | Gerstlauer | July 1 | |
| West Coast Racers | Six Flags Magic Mountain | Steel Launched roller coaster | Premier Rides | January 9 | |
| Whirlwind | Waldameer & Water World | Spinning roller coaster | SBF Visa Group | July 3 | |
| Gesengte Sau | Wiener Prater | Steel roller coaster | Gerstlauer | 2020 | |
| Wrath Of Zeus | VinWonders, Kiên Giang | Launched roller coaster | Vekoma | 2020 | |
| Ipanema Skate Ride | VinWonders, Kiên Giang | Surfrider Roller Coaster | Intamin | 2020 | |
| Eagle Wingspan | VinWonders, Kiên Giang | Cloud Coaster | Extreme Engineering | 2020 | |
| Light Of Revenge | Happy Valley Nanjing | Launched roller coaster | Intamin | November 12 | |
| FamilyBoomerang RollerCoaster | Happy Valley Nanjing | Family Boomerang | Vekoma | November 11 | |
| Forest Predator | Happy Valley Nanjing | Wing Coaster | Bolliger & Mabillard | November 11 | |
| Mine Escape | Happy Valley Nanjing | Mine train roller coaster | Golden Horse | November 11 | |
| Suspended Family Coaster | Happy Valley Nanjing | Suspended Family Coaster | Vekoma | November 11 | |
| Pitts Special | PowerLand | Infinity Coaster | Gerstlauer | June 24 | |
| Kuhddel Muuuhddel | Taunus Wunderland | Spinning roller coaster | SBF Visa Group | 2020 | |
| Formula Rossa Junior | Ferrari World Abu Dhabi | Junior roller Coaster | Zamperla | March 1 | |
| Pearly Whirly Coaster | Craig's Cruisers Family Fun Center, Mears | Big Air Coaster | SBF Visa Group | 2020 | |
| Osprey Mine Train | Chongqing Sunac Land | Mine train roller coaster | Golden Horse | August 2020 | |
| Circus Carnival | Oriental Heritage Jiangyou | Inverted roller coaster | Beijing Shibaolai Amusement Equipment | July 18 | |
| Flying Over Gou Xiong Ling | Oriental Heritage Jiangyou | Junior Coaster | Vekoma | July 18 | |
| Puppy Coaster | Oriental Heritage Jiangyou | Steel Family roller coaster | unknown | July 18 | |
| unknown | Oriental Heritage Jiangyou | Water coaster | unknown | July 18 | |
| unknown | Xuzhou Paradise | Steel Family roller coaster | unknown | April 18 | |
| unknown | Xuzhou Paradise | Steel roller coaster | unknown | April 18 | |
| unknown | Xuzhou Paradise | Inverted roller coaster | Golden Horse | April 18 | |
| unknown | Xuzhou Paradise | Spinning roller coaster | Golden Horse | April 18 | |
| Buffalo Hunt | Fort Hays Chuckwagon | Mystical Hex | Wiegand | October 3 | |

==== Relocated ====
| Name | Park | Type | Manufacturer | Opened | Formerly | Ref(s) |
|---|---|---|---|---|---|---|
| Crazy Mouse | SpeedZone Los Angeles | Spinning Wild Mouse roller coaster | Zamperla | In Storage | Crazy Mouse at Niagara Amusement Park & Splash World | |
| Family Coaster | Family Park, Monts | Family roller coaster | SBF Visa Group | July 1 | Family Coaster at Family Park, Saint-Martin-le-Beau | |
| Gold Rush | Family Park, Monts | Steel roller coaster | Zierer | July 1 | Gold Rush at Loudoun Castle | |
| Gold Rush | Kingoland | Family roller coaster | Pinfari | June 20 | Python at Gulliver's Milton Keynes | |
| Bayou Express | Le Fleury | Family roller coaster | Zierer | 2020 | Karavanen at Tivoli Gardens | |
| Max's Doggy Dog Coaster | SpeedZone Los Angeles | Family roller coaster | SBF Visa Group | In Storage | Max's Doggy Dog Coaster at Niagara Amusement Park & Splash World | |
| unknown | Luna Park Sincan | Steel roller coaster | Pinfari | 2020 | unknown at Lunapark Mersin | |
| unknown | Baghdad Island | Steel roller coaster | Pinfari | 2020 | Orkanens Øje at Tivoli Friheden | |

==== Refurbished ====
| Name | Park | Type | Manufacturer | Opened | Formerly | Ref(s) |
|---|---|---|---|---|---|---|
| Spartan Race | VinWonders, Kiên Giang | Family Boomerang | Vekoma | April 2020 | Flying Dolphin Coaster | |
| The Gold Coaster | Dreamworld | Steel roller coaster | Arrow Dynamics | December 2020 | Hot Wheels Sidewinder | |
| Monkey Mayhem | West Midland Safari Park | Spinning roller coaster | Reverchon | 2020 | Walls' Twister Ride | |

=== Other attractions ===
==== New ====
| Name | Park | Type | Opened | Ref(s) |
|---|---|---|---|---|
| Area 72 | Kings Island | Themed Area | 2020 | |
| Awesome Planet | Epcot | Show | January 17 | |
| Banzai Pipeline | Six Flags Hurricane Harbor (Six Flags Over Texas) | Multi-slide complex | 2020 | |
| Boogie Board Racer | Carowinds | multi lane mat racer | 2020 | |
| Beagle Brigade Airfield* | Canada's Wonderland | Zamperla Flying Tigers | 2020 | |
| The Bourne Stuntacular | Universal Studios Florida | Stunt show | June 30 | |
| Catwoman Whip | Six Flags Over Georgia | Zamperla Endeavour | 2020 | |
| Cheetah Chase | Holiday World & Splashin' Safari | Launched Water coaster | 2020 | |
| CraZanity | Six Flags Mexico | Zamperla Giga Discovery Frisbee | 2020 | |
| Drawn to Life | Disney Springs | Cirque du Soleil show | 2020 | |
| Emmet's Flying Adventure | Legoland California | Flying Theater Simulator ride | 2020 | |
| Enchanted Tale of Beauty and the Beast | Tokyo Disneyland | Trackless dark ride | October 1 | |
| HarmonioUS | Epcot | Nighttime spectacular | 2020 | |
| Legoland Water park Gardaland | Gardaland | Water park | May 29 | |
| The LEGO Movie World | Legoland California | Themed area | 2020 | |
| Magic Happens | Disneyland | Parade | February 28 | |
| Mickey & Minnie's Runaway Railway | Disney's Hollywood Studios | Trackless dark ride | March 4 | |
| Mountain Bay Cliffs* | Splash Works (Canada's Wonderland) | Cliff-Jumping Attraction | 2020 | |
| Mystic River Falls | Silver Dollar City | River rapids | July 21 | |
| Paradise Island | Six Flags Hurricane Harbor Phoenix | Water play area | Summer 2020 | |
| Poison Ivy Toxic Twister | Six Flags Over Georgia | Scrambler | 2020 | |
| Python Plunge | Six Flags White Water | Water coaster | 2020 | |
| Star Wars: Rise of the Resistance | Disneyland | Trackless dark ride | January 17 | |
| Studio Cruiser | Malang Night Paradise | Trackless dark ride | May 20 | |
| Tidal Wave | Six Flags Hurricane Harbor Rockford | Water slide | 2020 | |
| Wahoo Racer | Six Flags Hurricane Harbor Oklahoma City | Racing Water slide | 2020 | |

- *Announced for 2020, opening delayed for 2021

==== Refurbished ====
| Name | Park | Type | Opened | Formerly | Ref(s) |
|---|---|---|---|---|---|
| Canada: Far and Wide | Epcot | Show | January 17 | O Canada! | |
| Impressions de France and Beauty and the Beast Sing-Along | Epcot | Alternating shows | January 17 | Impressions de France | |
| Old Mill | Kennywood | Old Mill (ride) | 2020 | Garfield's Nightmare | |

== Closed attractions & roller coasters ==
| Name | Park | Type | Closed | Refs |
|---|---|---|---|---|
| Racing | Dyrehavsbakken | Steel roller coaster | September 13 | |
| Big Red Car Ride | Dreamworld | Dark ride | August 12 | |
| FlowRider | Dreamworld | FlowRider | August 12 | |
| Wild Arctic | SeaWorld San Diego | Simulator ride | January 10 | |
| Goliath | Six Flags New England | Giant Inverted Boomerang | 2020 | |
| Polka Marina | Efteling | Merry-go-round | November 30 | |
| Primeval Whirl | Disney's Animal Kingdom | Spinning Wild Mouse roller coaster | March 15 | |
| Rocky Hollow Log Ride | Dreamworld | Log flume | February 8 | |
| Studio Tram Tour: Behind the Magic | Walt Disney Studios Park | Tram Tour | January 5 | |
| Superman: Tower of Power | Six Flags St. Louis | Drop Tower | 2020 | |
| Sylvester's Bounce 'n' Pounce | Warner Bros. Movie World | Frog Hopper | 2020 | |
| Ariel's Grotto | Tokyo DisneySea | Meet and greet area | January 31 | |
| Cheetah | Wild Adventures | Wooden roller coaster | March 15 | |
| Fantasmic! | Tokyo DisneySea | Live show | February 28 | |
| Frozen – Live at the Hyperion | Disney California Adventure | Live show | October 9 | |
| Lights, Motors, Action!: Extreme Stunt Show | Walt Disney Studios Park | Stunt show | March 13 | |
| Madame Tussauds Delhi | Regal Theatre, New Delhi | Wax Museum | December 30 | |
| Rivers of Light | Disney's Animal Kingdom | Live hydrotechnic show | March 12 | |
| Snoopy's Great Race | Universal Studios Japan | Family roller coaster | 2020 | |
| Madame Tussauds Washington D.C. | Penn Quarter | Wax Museum | March 17 | |
| Star Wars Launch Bay | Disney's Hollywood Studios | Walk-through | March 13 | |
| The Muppets Present...Great Moments in American History | Magic Kingdom | Puppet show | February 17 | |
| The Lion King: Rhythms of the Pride Lands | Disneyland Paris | Show | September 13 | |
| Voyage to the Iron Reef | Knott's Berry Farm | Interactive dark ride | January 5 | |
| Bayern Kurve | Kennywood | Bayern Kurve | September 7 | |
| Kangaroo | Kennywood | Bartlett Flying Coaster | September 7 | |
| Paratrooper | Kennywood | Paratrooper | September 7 | |
| Volcano | Kennywood | Enterprise | September 7 | |
