= Overseas Chinese Town Enterprises =

State owned enterprise

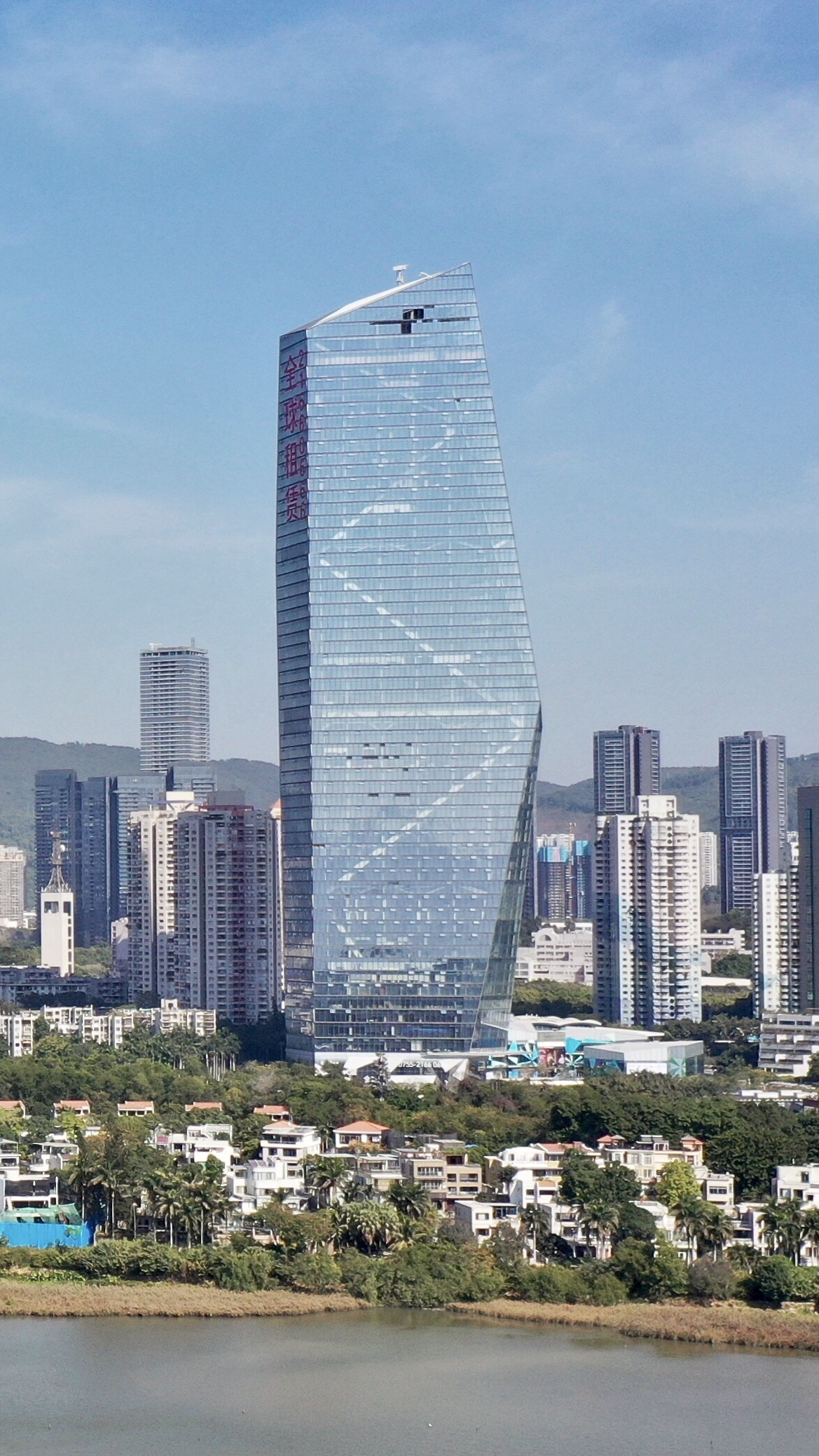
- OCT Tower in Overseas Chinese Town, Nanshan District of Shenzhen
- Trade name: OCT Group
- Type: State-owned enterprise
- Industry: Tourism and Culture
- Founded: 1985
- Headquarters: Shenzhen, China
- Area served: China
- Revenue: 110,348,810,000 renminbi (2018)
- Owner: State Council of China (100%)
- Subsidiaries: Overseas Chinese Town (53.47%); Konka Group (29.99%); OCT Bay (100%)
- Website: www.chinaoct.com
- Footnotes in a consolidated basis; equity and profit excluded minority interests; in Chinese Accounting Standards

Overseas Chinese Town Enterprises Co.
- Simplified Chinese: 华侨城集团公司
- Traditional Chinese: 華僑城集團公司
Transcriptions
Standard Mandarin
- Hanyu Pinyin: Huáqiáochéng Jítuán Gōngsī
Yue: Cantonese
- Jyutping: waa4 kiu4 sing4 zaap6 tyun4 gung1 si1

Overseas Chinese Town Enterprises Co. is a Chinese state-owned enterprise, supervised by the State-owned Assets Supervision and Administration Commission of the State Council. Overseas Chinese Town Enterprises is the parent company of publicly traded companies Overseas Chinese Town Limited (SZSE: 000069), Overseas Chinese Town (Asia) (SEHK: 3366, a subsidiary of Overseas Chinese Town Company) and Konka Group (SZSE: 000016). It is engaged in cross-sector and cross-industry operation.

The company was founded on 1985 and is headquartered in Shenzhen, China. Since 1985, the company has fostered three leading major businesses in China, which are tourism and related cultural industry, real estate, hotel development, and manufacture of electronic products. As the listed subsidiary, OCT A provides a platform for capital operation of OCT group.

The company is well known for its nationally famous brands, including six Happy Valley amusement parks, Konka Group, Splendid China Folk Village, Window of the World, OCT East, OCT Grand Hotel, Venice Hotel, OCT Harbour and so on.

== History ==
- In 1985, OCT starting from a stretch of mud flat beside Shenzhen Bay.
- In 1994, the former CEO Ren Kelei (Chinese: 任克雷) started reconstructing OCT group's business structure by cutting from more than 30 industries to only 3 main focusing areas.
- In November 1997, OCT Group incorporated a subsidiary OCT Holding and listed on Shenzhen Stock Exchange.
- In 2000, OCT Group has invested to construct multiple large-scale comprehensive projects, such as Beijing OCT, Shenzhen OCT East, Shanghai OCT, Shanghai Pujiang OCT, Chengdu OCT, Jiangsu Taizhou OCT, Shenzhen Happy Harbor, Yunnan OCT, Tianjin OCT, Wuhan OCT, Xi'an OCT, Qingdao OCT, and so on.
- In 2004, OCT had been granted a title of the first batch of "National Culture Industry Demonstration Base" by the State Ministry of Culture and had been granted the title of one of the first two "National Culture Industry Demonstration Park Area" by the State Ministry of Culture in August 2007.
- In 2010, OCT Group has been granted the title of "Top 30 Culture Enterprise" by the Publicity Department of the Chinese Communist Party.
- In 2015, consulting and design firm AECOM ranked OCT parks China as #4 of Top 10 Worldwide Theme Park Groups with 30 million visitors in the year.

== List of amusement parks ==
Park name	Location	Opening date	Status	Roller Coasters	Ref
Happy Coast Theme Park Foshan	Shunde, Foshan, Guangdong, China	2019	Operating	2	
Happy Valley Shenzhen	Nanshan, Shenzhen, Guangdong, China	1998	Operating	5	
Happy Valley Beijing	Chaoyang, Beijing, China	2006	Operating	6	
Happy Valley Chengdu	Jinniu, Chengdu, Sichuan, China	2009	Operating	6	
Happy Valley Shanghai	Songjiang, Shanghai, China	2009	Operating	7	
Happy Valley Wuhan	Hongshan, Wuhan, Hubei, China	2012	Operating	5	
Happy Valley Tianjin	Dongli, Tianjin, China	2013	Operating	4	
Happy Valley Chongqing	Yubei, Chongqing, China	2017	Operating	4	
Happy Valley Nanjing	Qixia, Nanjing, Jiangsu, China	2020	Operating	4	
OCT East	Yantian, Shenzhen, Guangdong, China	2010	Operating	1	
Visionland Liuzhou	Yufeng, Liuzhou, Guangxi, China	2017	Operating	4	
Visionland Changde	Dingcheng, Changde, Hunan, China	2020	Operating	2	
Window of the World Changsha	Kaifu, Changsha, Hunan, China	1997	Operating	4	
Window of the World Shenzhen	Nanshan, Shenzhen, Guangdong, China	1994	Operating	0	
