= River Country =

River Country may refer to:

- Bridge River Country, an area in British Columbia, Canada
- Disney's River Country, a defunct water park at Walt Disney World Resort, Florida, U.S.
- Peace River Country, an area in Alberta and British Columbia, Canada
- Powder River Country, an area in northeastern Wyoming, U.S.
- Wild River Country, a defunct water park in North Little Rock, Arkansas, U.S.

== See also ==
- KID-FM, an American radio station (now KWFI-FM) that aired a country music format under the "River Country" name from 2011 to 2018
