= Overseas Chinese Town Limited =

Chinese State-owned Company

Overseas Chinese Town
- OCT Limited logo (same as OCT Group)
- Formerly: Overseas Chinese Town Holding
- Type: public
- Traded as: SZSE: 000069
- Founded: 1997
- Founder: Overseas Chinese Town Enterprises
- Headquarters: Shenzhen, China
- Area served: mainland China
- Key people: Duan Xiannian (Chairman & Party Committee Secretary)
- Revenue: ▲CN¥32.236 billion (2015)
- Operating income: ▼CN¥6.888 billion (2015)
- Net income: ▼CN¥4.641 billion (2015)
- Total assets: ▲CN¥115.266 billion (2015)
- Total equity: ▲CN¥38.086 billion (2015)
- Owner: Overseas Chinese Town Enterprises (57.66%); National Social Security Fund (4%); China Securities Finance (2.96%); Central Huijin (1.04%)
- Subsidiaries: Overseas Chinese Town (Asia) (66.66%)
- Footnotes in a consolidated basis; net assets and net profits excluding minority interests; in Chinese Accounting Standards

Shenzhen Overseas Chinese Town Company Limited known as OCT Limited (formerly OCT Holding) is a publicly traded company based in Shenzhen, China. It is a subsidiary of state-owned Overseas Chinese Town Enterprises (or OCT Group).

OCT Limited was incorporated in 1997.

OCT Limited was ranked 1,164th in 2016 Forbes Global 2000 List. OCT Limited is a constituent of SZSE 100 Index (blue chip index) and pan-China index CSI 300 Index.

== Equity investments ==
- Window of the World (49%)
- Window of the World (Changsha) (25%)

== Board of directors ==
As of 17 November 2016

- Chairman: Duan Xiannian (Chinese: 段先念) (also served in parent company Overseas Chinese Town Enterprises)
- President and executive director: Wang Xiaowen (Chinese: 王晓雯) (also served in parent company Overseas Chinese Town Enterprises)
- Vice-president and executive director: Wang Jiuling (Chinese: 王久玲) (nominated by ultimate parent entity the SASAC of the State Council)
- Independent director: Chinese: 许刚
- Independent director: Chinese: 吴安迪
- Independent director: Chinese: 周纪昌
- Independent director: Chinese: 余海龙
