= Konka Group =

Chinese electronics and appliances company

Konka Group Co., Ltd.

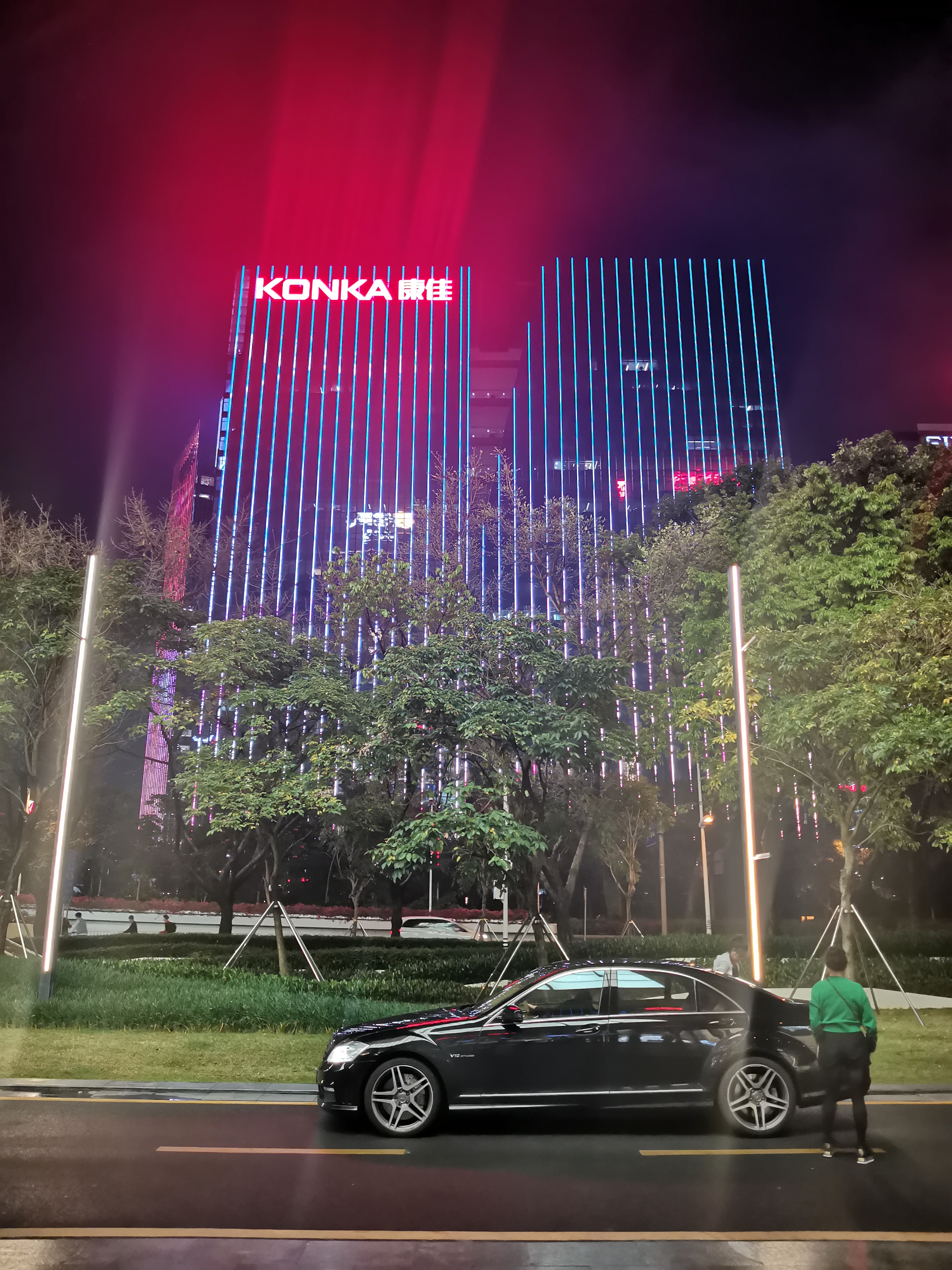
- Headquarter
- Native name: 康佳集团
- Type: Public
- Traded as: SZSE: 000016
- Industry: Electronics
- Founded: May 21, 1980; 46 years ago
- Headquarters: Shenzhen, Guangdong, China
- Area served: Worldwide
- Key people: Liú Fèngxǐ (刘凤喜) (Chairman and President)
- Products: Consumer electronics
- Owner: Overseas Chinese Town Enterprises
- Website: www.konkaglobal.com (Global) www.konka.com (China)

Konka Group
- Simplified Chinese: 康佳集团股份有限公司
- Traditional Chinese: 康佳集團股份有限公司
Transcriptions
Standard Mandarin
- Hanyu Pinyin: Kāngjiā Jítuán Gǔfènyǒuxiàngōngsī
Yue: Cantonese
- Jyutping: hong1 gaai1 zaap6 tyun4 gu2 fan6*2 jau5 haan6 gung1 si1

Konka Group Co., Ltd. (Chinese: 康佳集团; pinyin: Kāngjiā Jítuán) is a Chinese manufacturer of electronics products headquartered in Shenzhen, Guangdong and listed on Shenzhen Stock Exchange.

Konka makes consumer electronics and white goods, such as televisions, refrigerators, washing machines and air conditioners. Konka has also introduced mobile devices, including mobile phones and tablets as well as smartwatches and mobile accessories. The group has expanded to other areas, such as financial investments, PaaS, and industrial parks.

== History ==
It was founded in 1980 as Shenzhen Konka Electronic Group Co., Ltd. and changed its name to Konka Group Co., Ltd. in 1995.

The company manufactures electronics and is headquartered in Shenzhen, China. It has manufacturing facilities in multiple cities in Guangdong, China. The company distributes its products in China's domestic market and to overseas markets.

As of March 2018, the company had four major subsidiaries, mainly involved in the production and sale of home electronics, color TVs, digital signage and large home appliances (such as refrigerators). As of May 2009, Hogshead Spouter Co. invests in and manages Konka's energy efficiency product lines.

== Konka E-display Co. ==
Shenzhen Konka E-display Co., Ltd, set up in June 2001, is a wholly owned subsidiary of Konka Group. Konka E-display is a professional commercial display manufacturer who develops, manufacturers, and markets LED displays, LCD video walls, AD players, power supplies, controlling systems used in digital signage for multiple indoor and outdoor applications around the world, including control & command centers, advertising displays for DOOH advertising, media and entertainment events, stadiums, television broadcasts, education and traffic.

== Primary Product Groups ==
- Televisions
- Digital Signage LCD/LED
- Refrigerators and other Kitchen Appliances
