= Window of the World (Changsha) =

Theme park in Changsha, Hunan, China

- 世界之窗
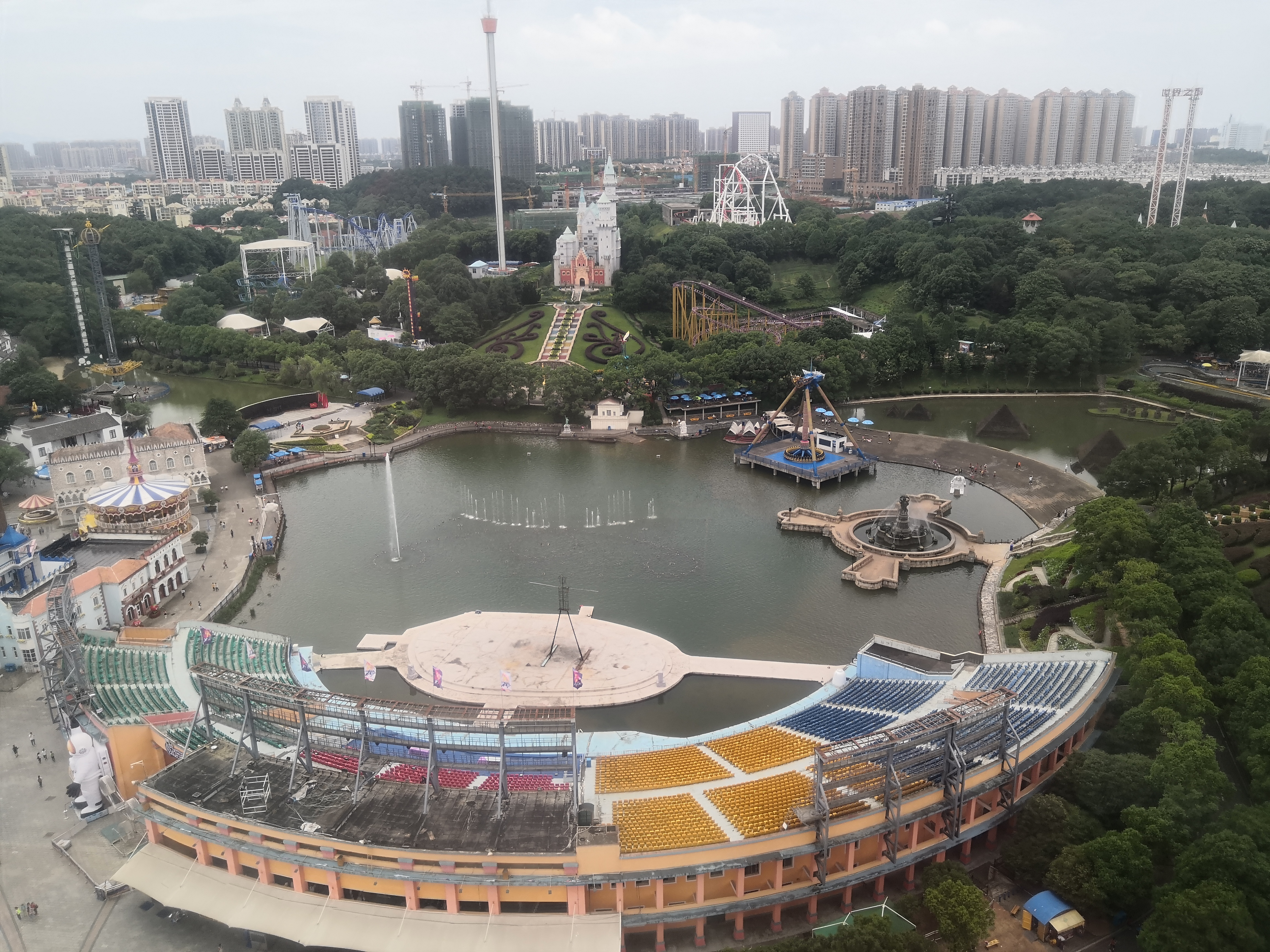
- Window of the World

- Location within Hunan
- Type: Theme park
- Location: Xingsha, Changsha County, Hunan
- Coordinates: 28°14′20″N 113°03′17″E
- Area: 0.4-square-kilometre (0.15 sq mi)
- Created: October 16, 1997
- Owner: Hunan TV& Broadcast Intermediary CO., LTD. Overseas Chinese Town Enterprises; China Travel Service
- Status: Open all year
- Website: www.colorfulworld.cn

Chinese name
- Simplified Chinese: 长沙世界之窗
- Traditional Chinese: 長沙世界之窗
Transcriptions
Standard Mandarin
- Hanyu Pinyin: Chángshā Shìjièzhīchuāng

The Window of the World is a theme park located in Changsha, Hunan, China. It has about 50 reproductions of some of the most famous tourist attractions in the world located on 40 hectares of land.

== History ==
The Window of the World was founded in 1997 by Hunan Dianguang Media co., LTD, Overseas Chinese Town Limited and China Travel Service (Hong Kong). As of 30 June 2016 Overseas Chinese Town Limited owned 25% stake.

== List of major attractions in the Window of the World ==
Region	Reproductions	Notes
Australia	Sydney Opera House	
Cambodia	Angkor Wat, Guishan Guanyin	
Chile	Ahu Akivi	
Egypt	Giza Pyramids, Lighthouse of Alexandria	
France	Eiffel Tower, Louvre Pyramid	
Germany	Neuschwanstein Castle, Heidelberg Gate	
Indonesia	Tongkonan	
Iraq	Hanging Gardens of Babylon	
Italy	Leaning Tower of Pisa, Trinità dei Monti	
Japan	Mount Fuji, Tokyo Imperial Palace	
Kuwait	Kuwait Water Towers	
Myanmar	Shwedagon Pagoda	
Netherlands	Tulip pastoral scenery	
Turkey	Hagia Sophia	
United Kingdom	Tower Bridge, Palace of Westminster	
United States	Mount Rushmore, Statue of Liberty, Unisphere, United States Capitol	

== Entertainment facilities ==
- Roller coaster
- Bungee jump
- Ferris wheel
- Fairground ride apparatus
- bumper boat
- The peacock garden
- The cinema
- Acrobatic performance
- Western theatre
- Western-style buildings
- Water entertainment facilities

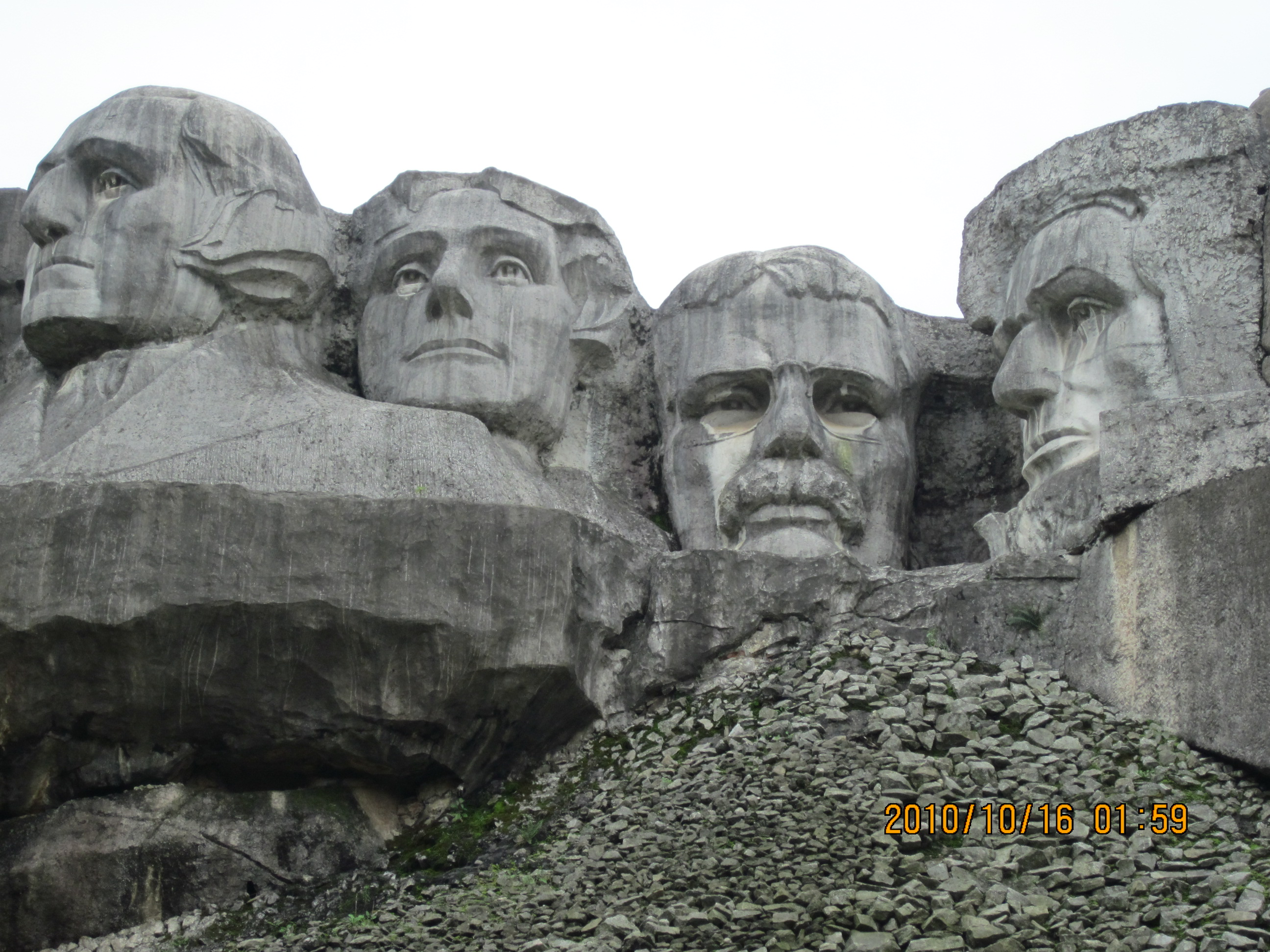
Mount Rushmore

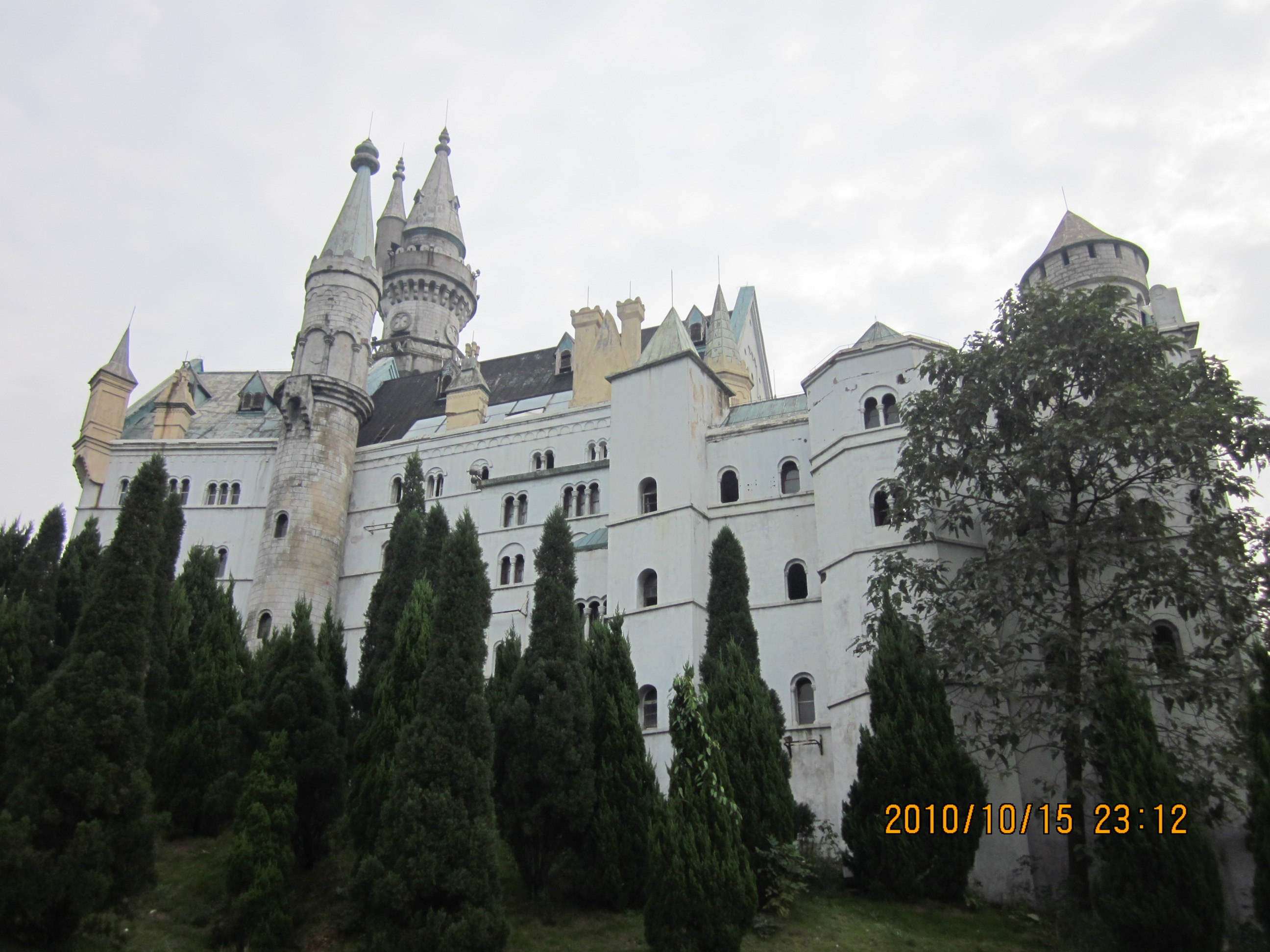
Neuschwanstein Castle

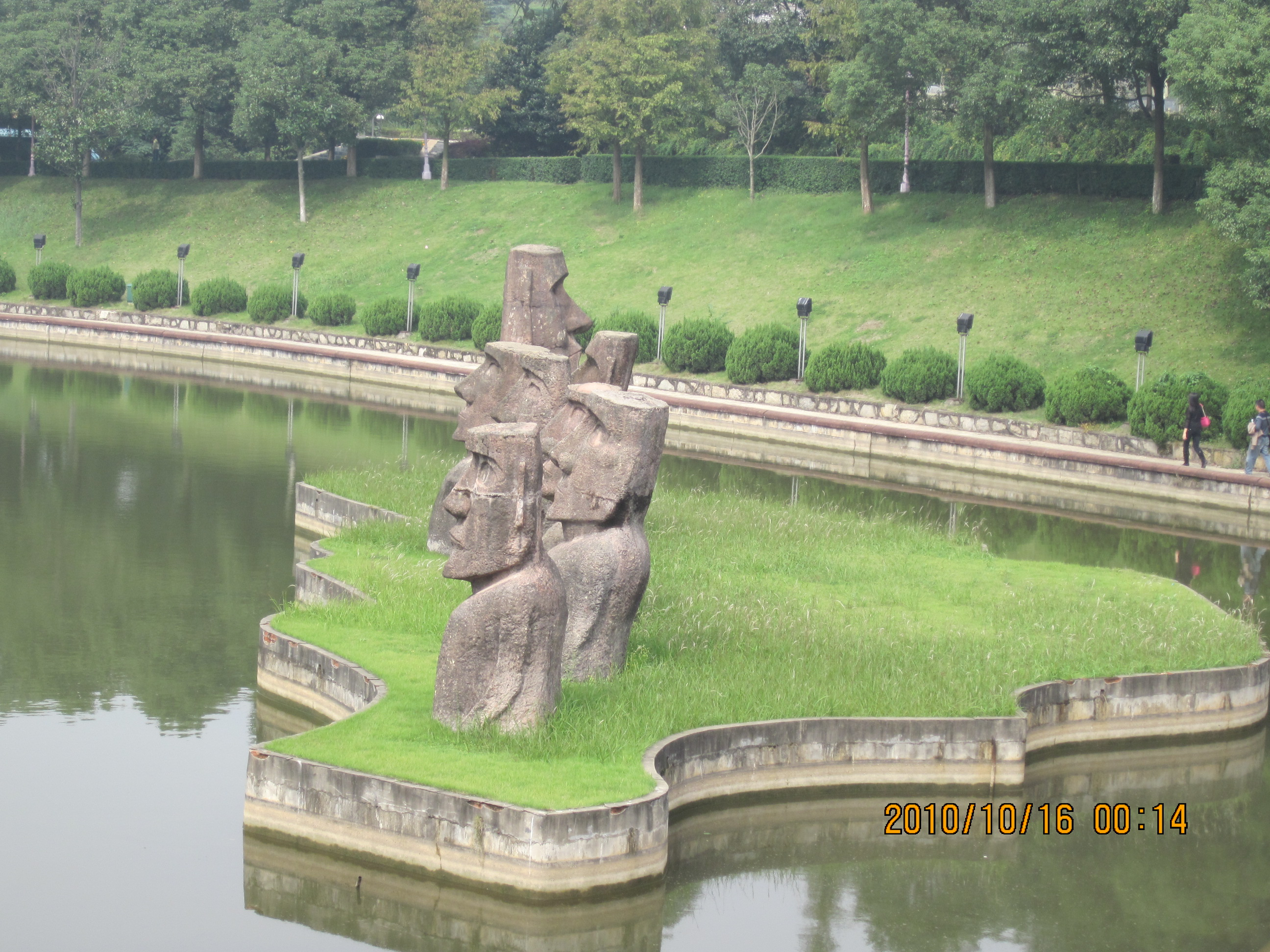
Ahu Akivi

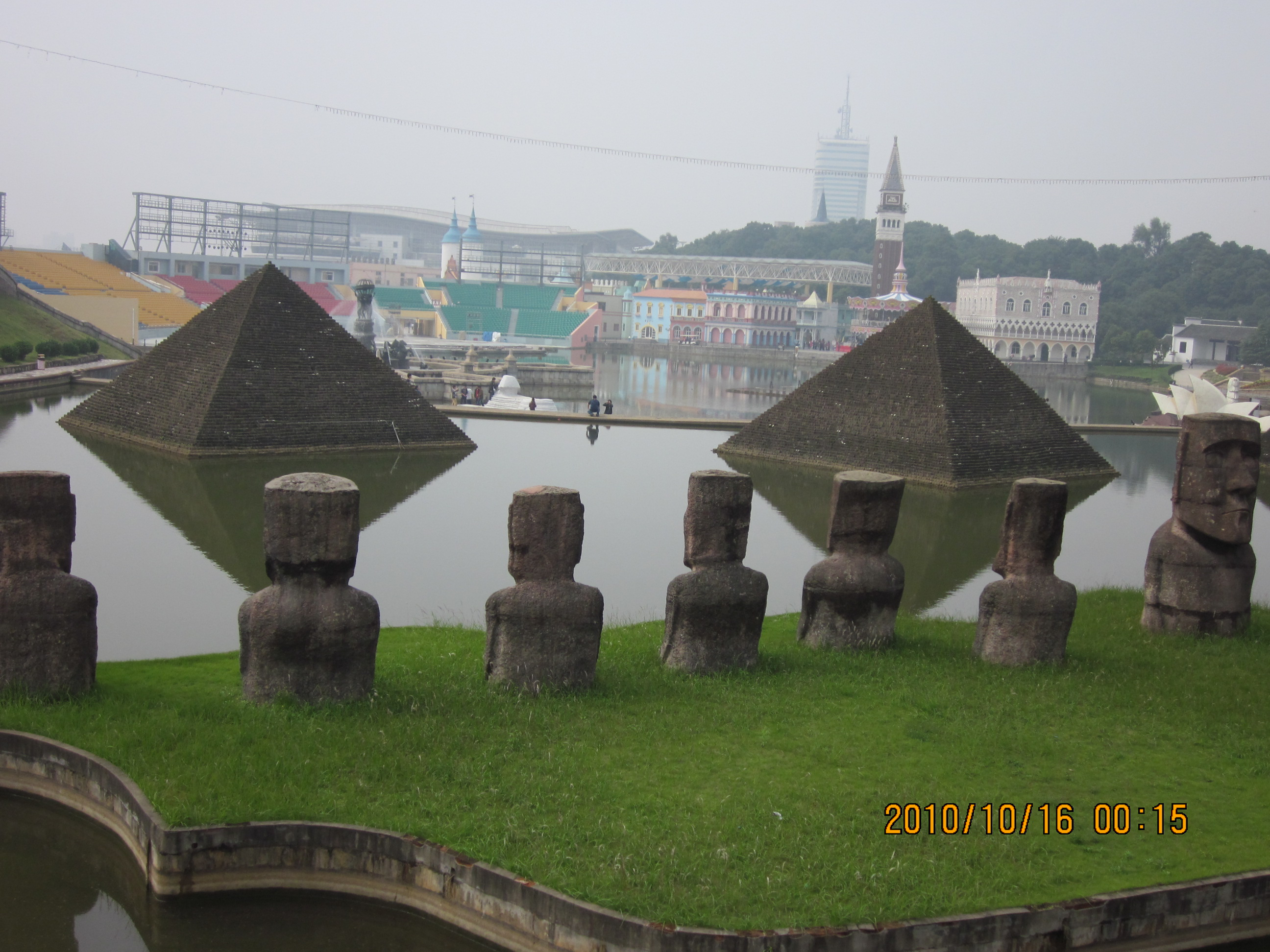
Pyramid

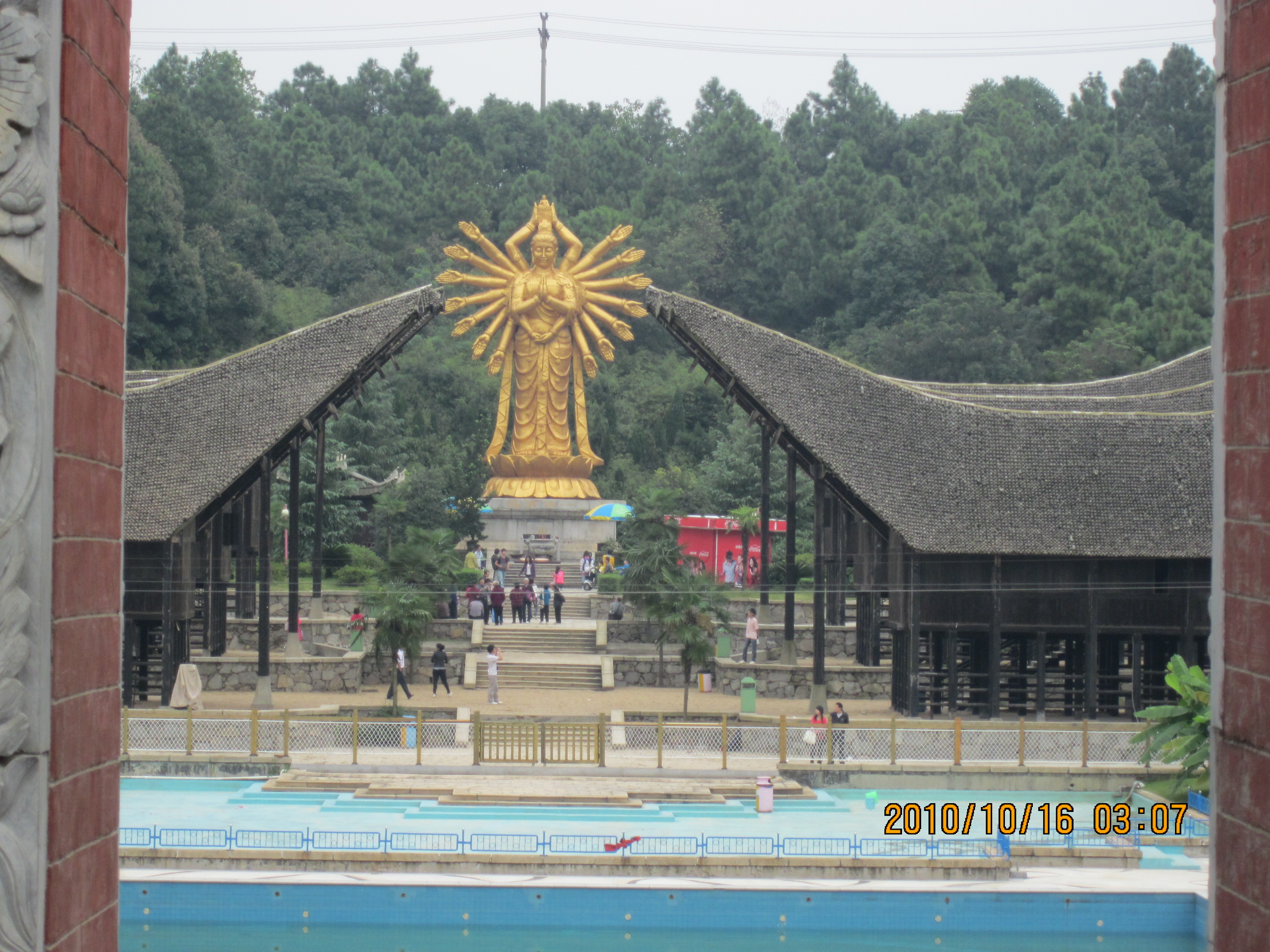
Thousand-Hand Kwan-yin

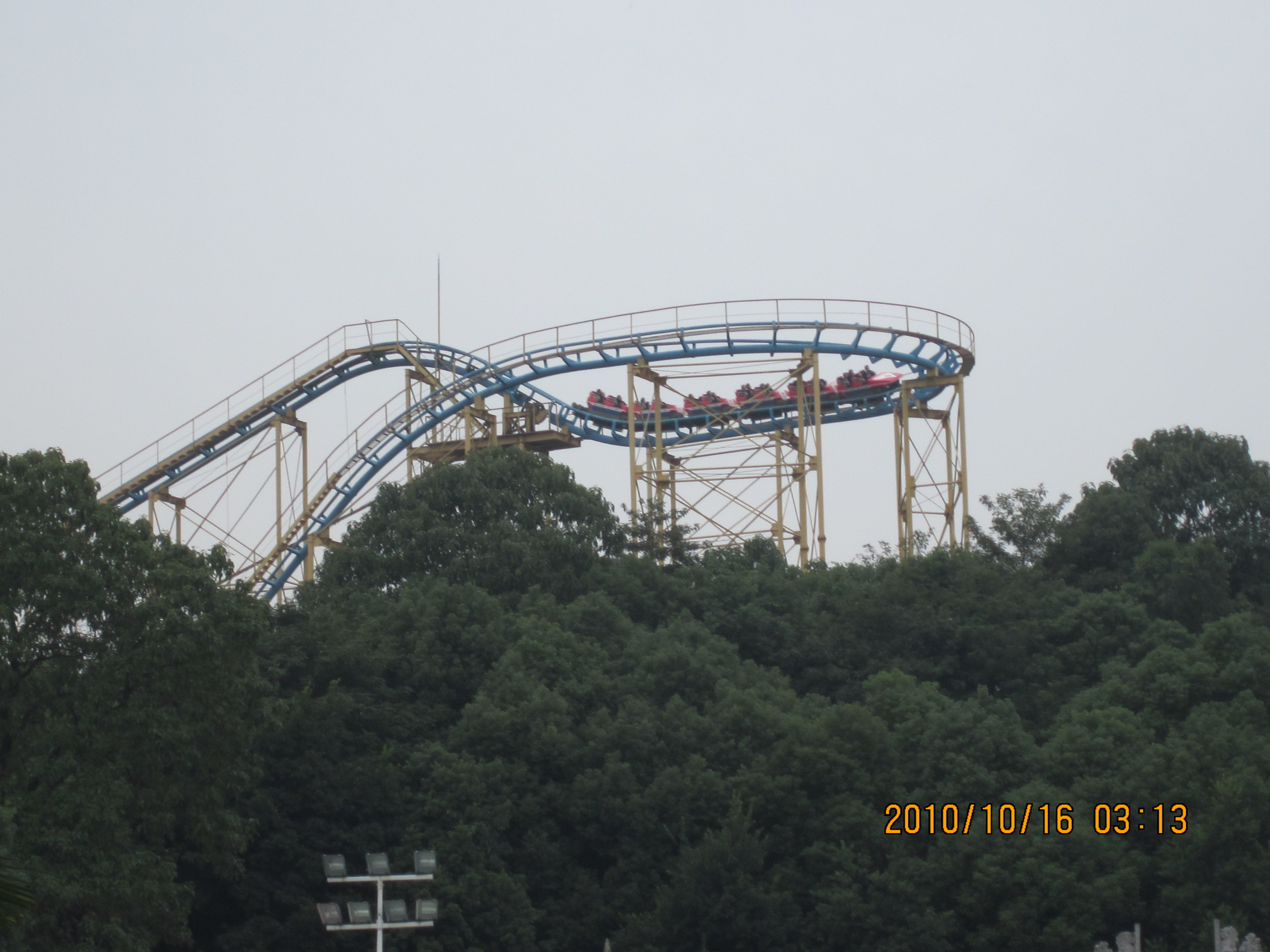
Roller coaster

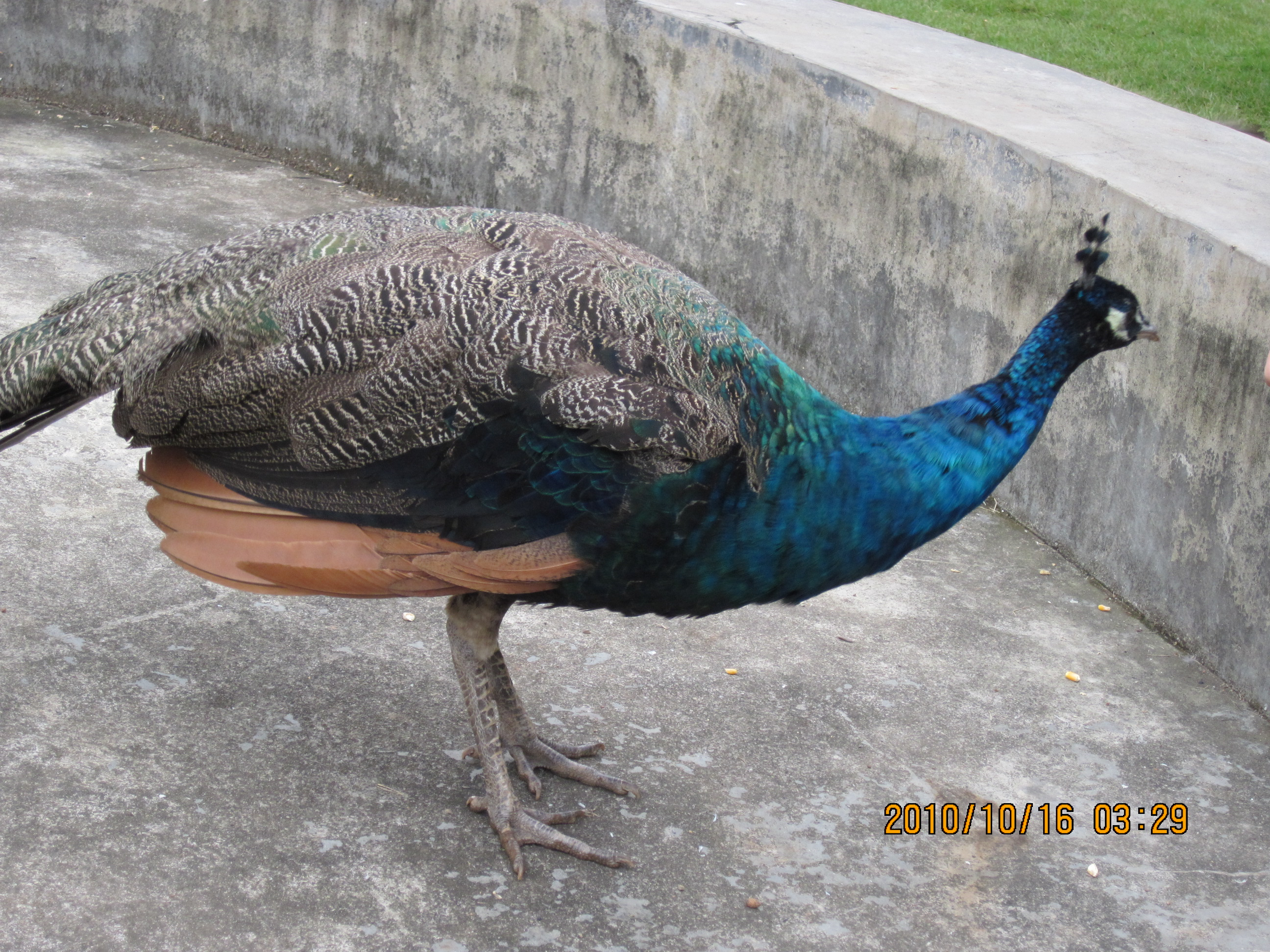
The peacock garden

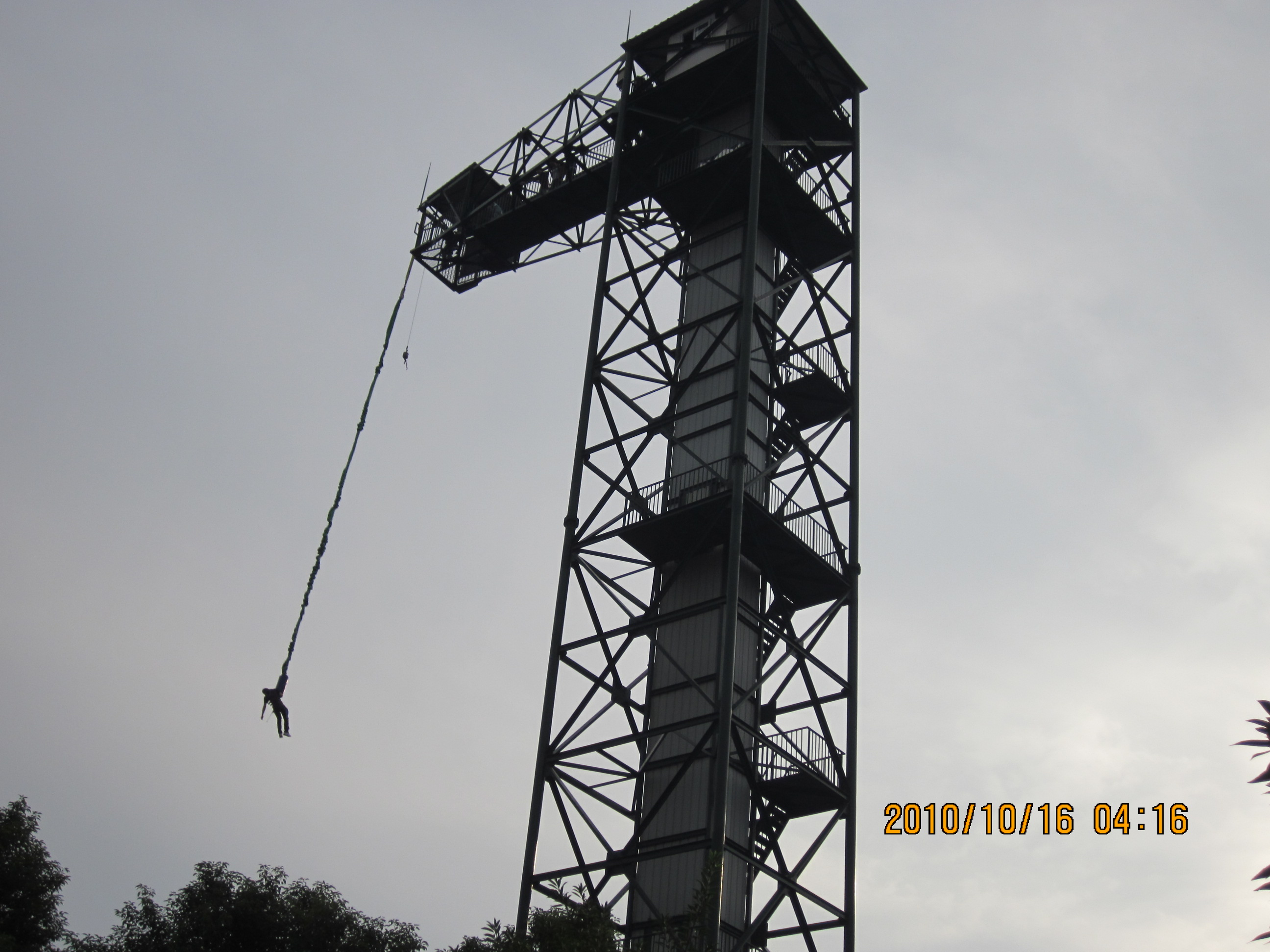
Bungee jump

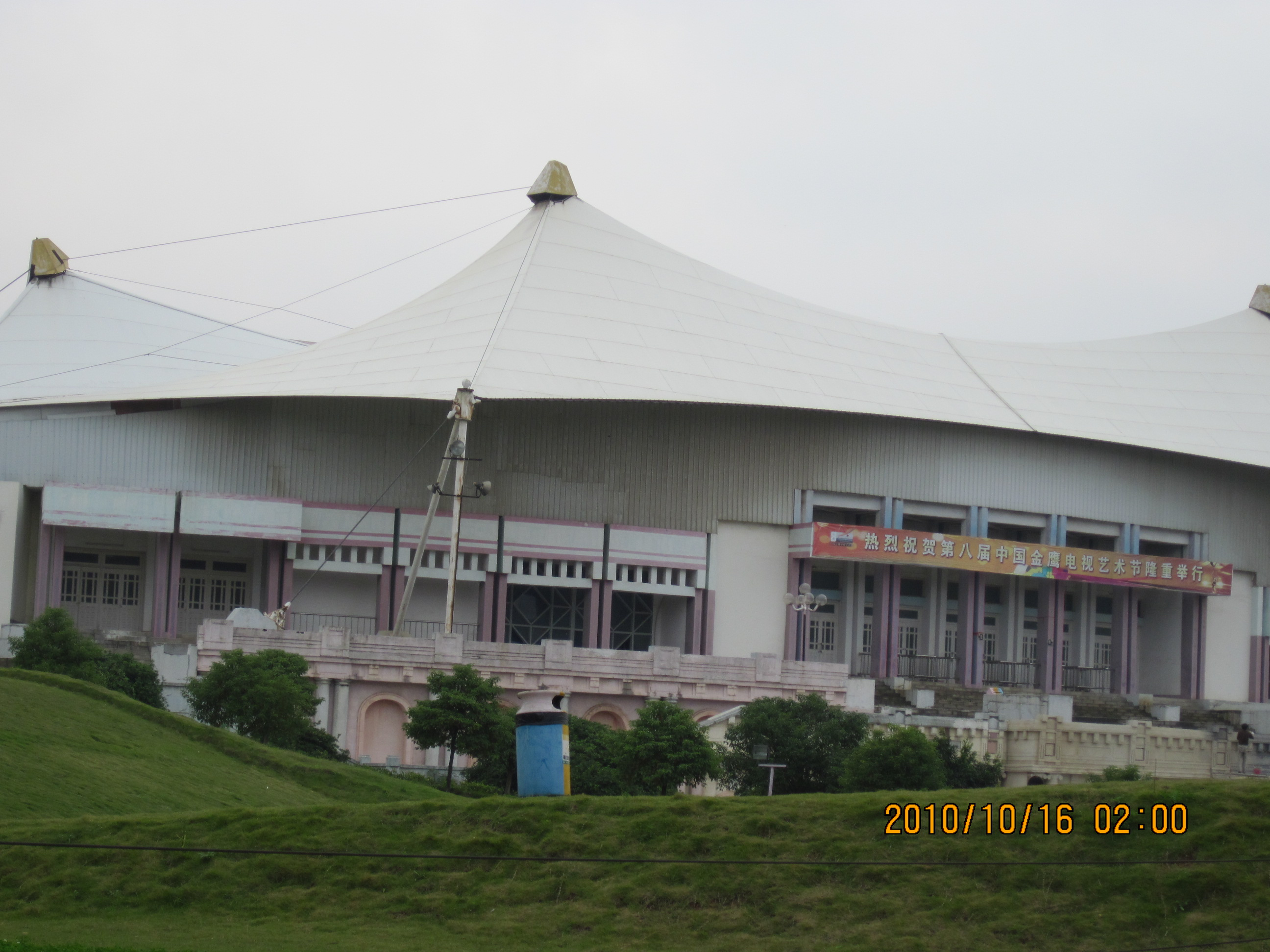
The cinema

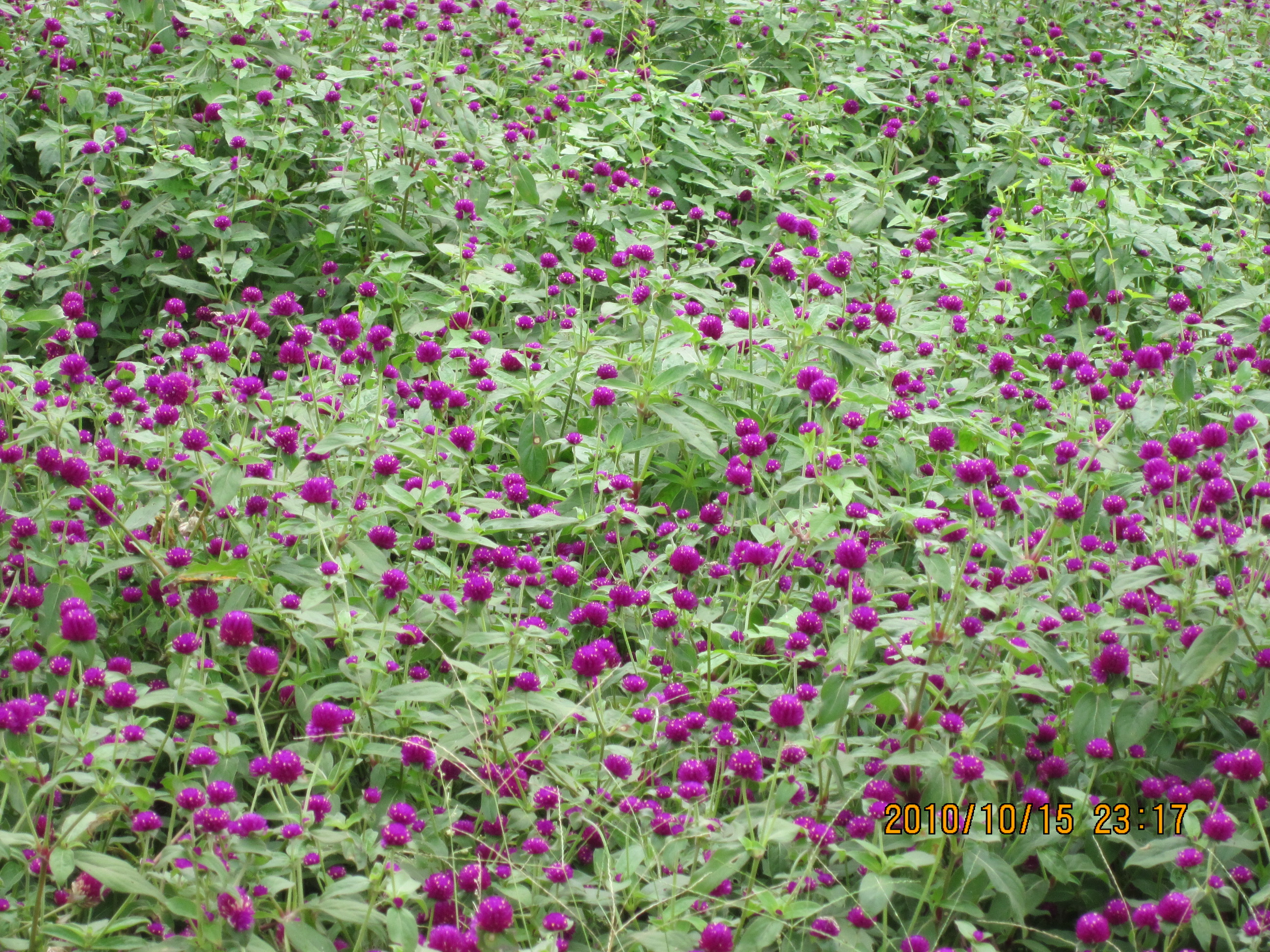
Tulip pastoral scenery

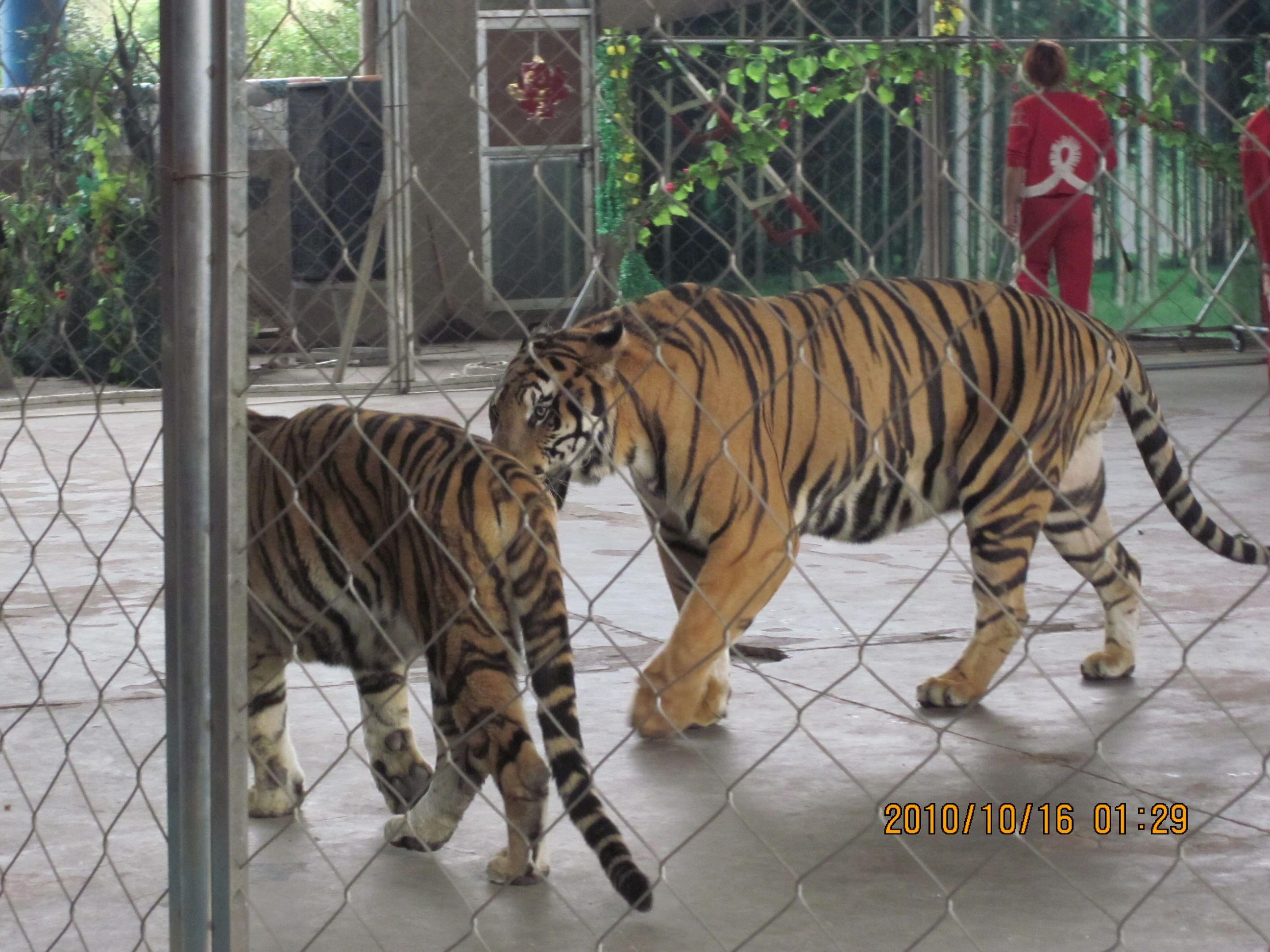
Acrobatic performance

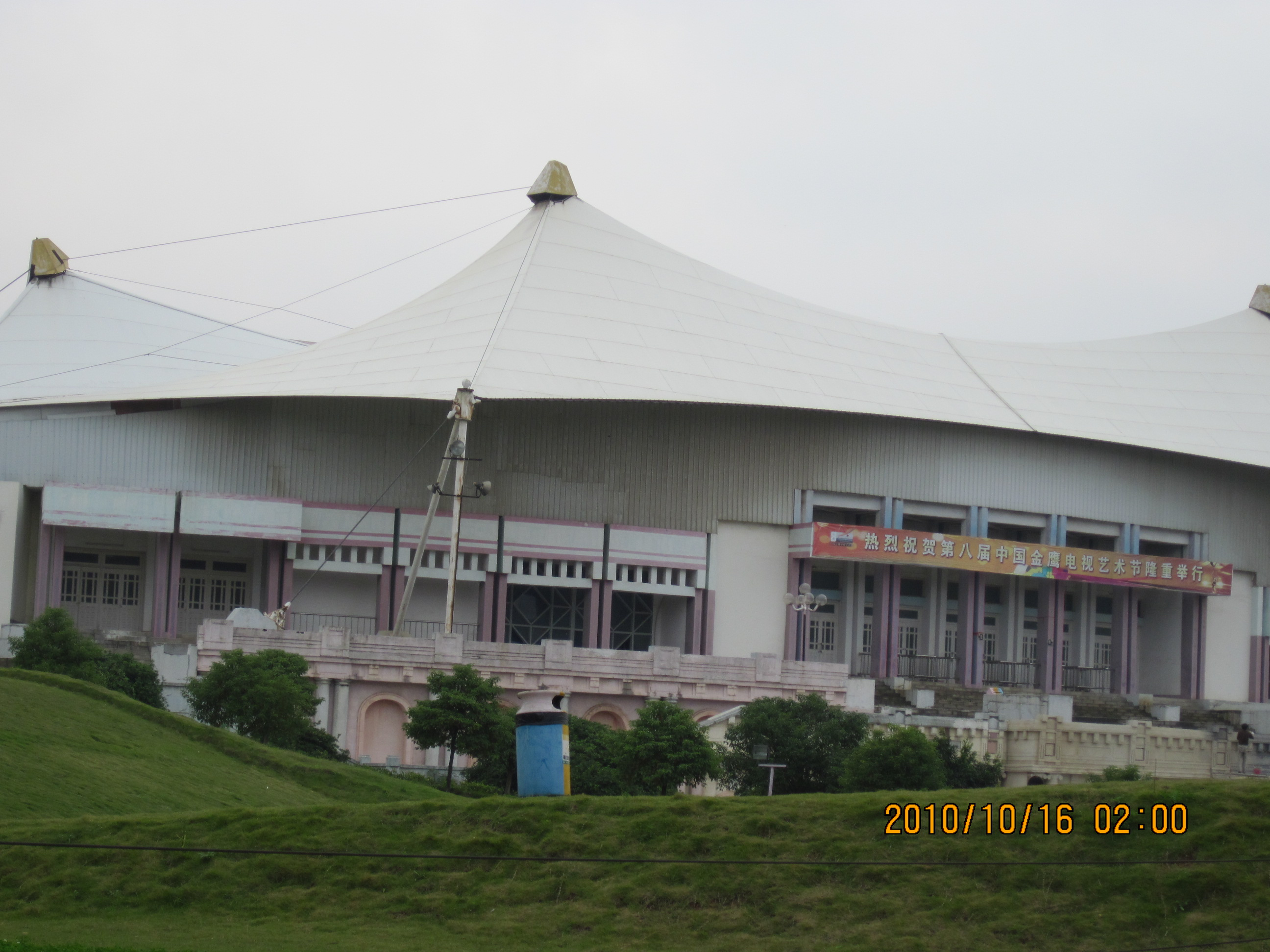
Western theatre

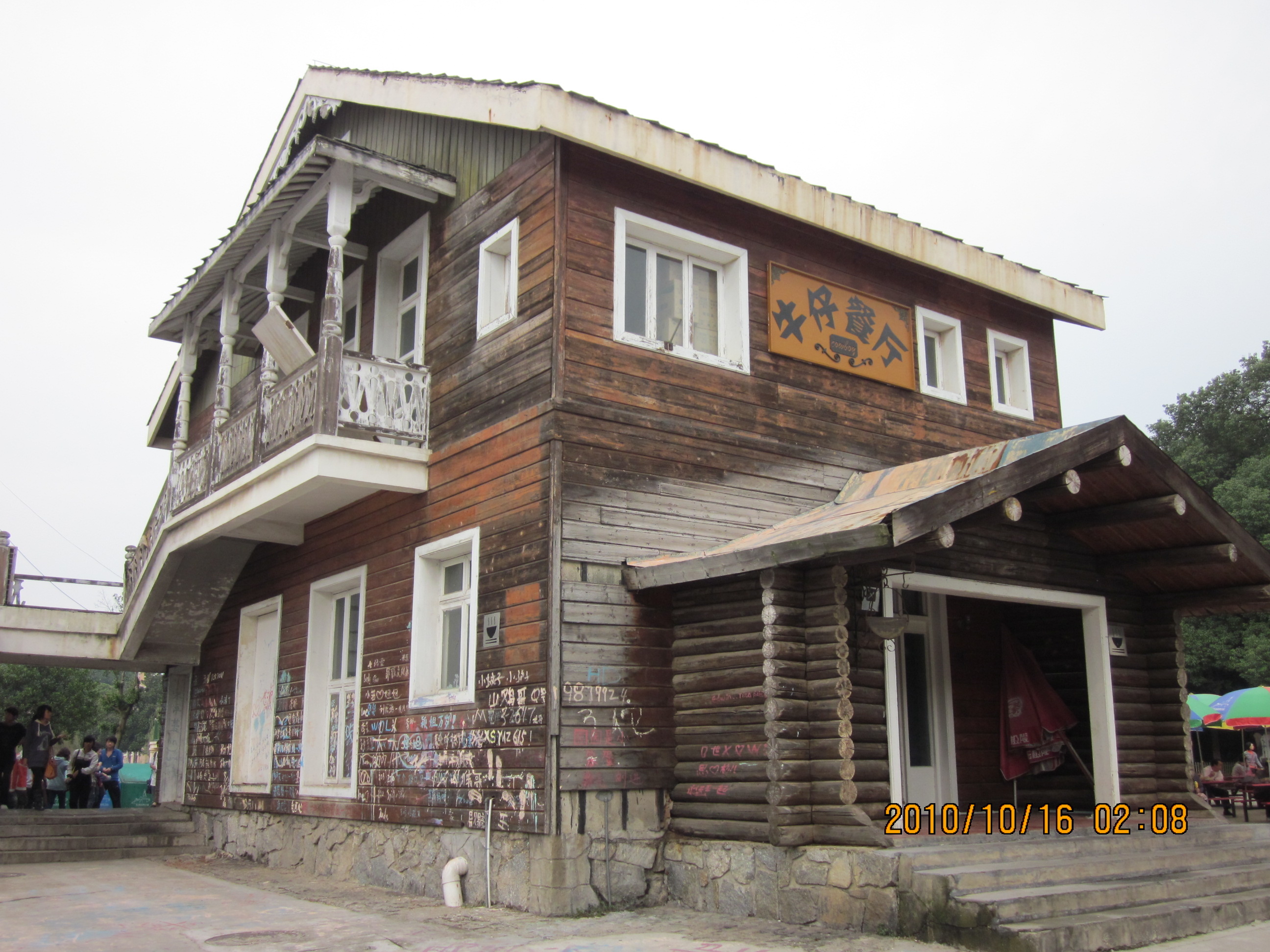
Western-style buildings

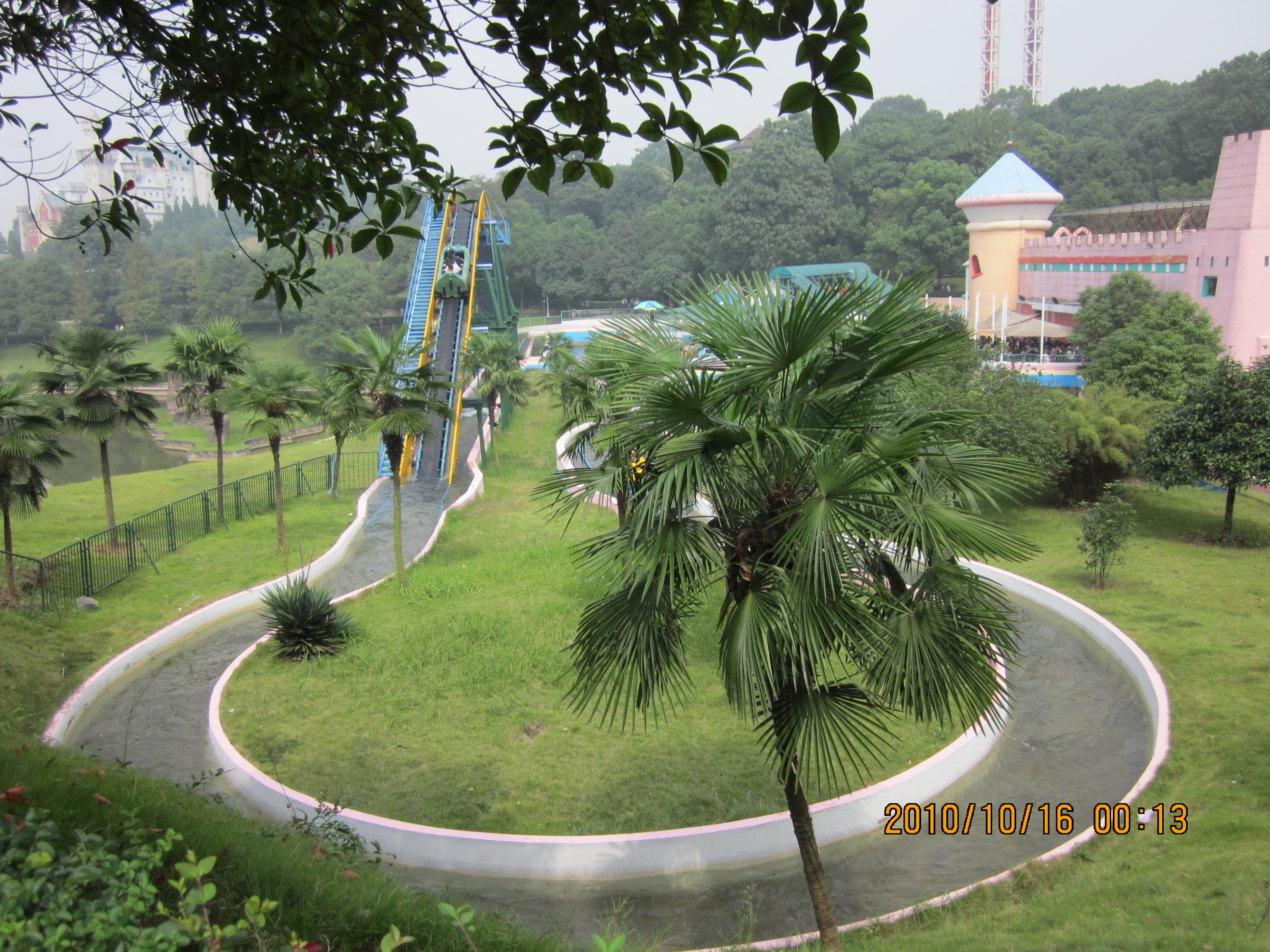
Water entertainment facilities

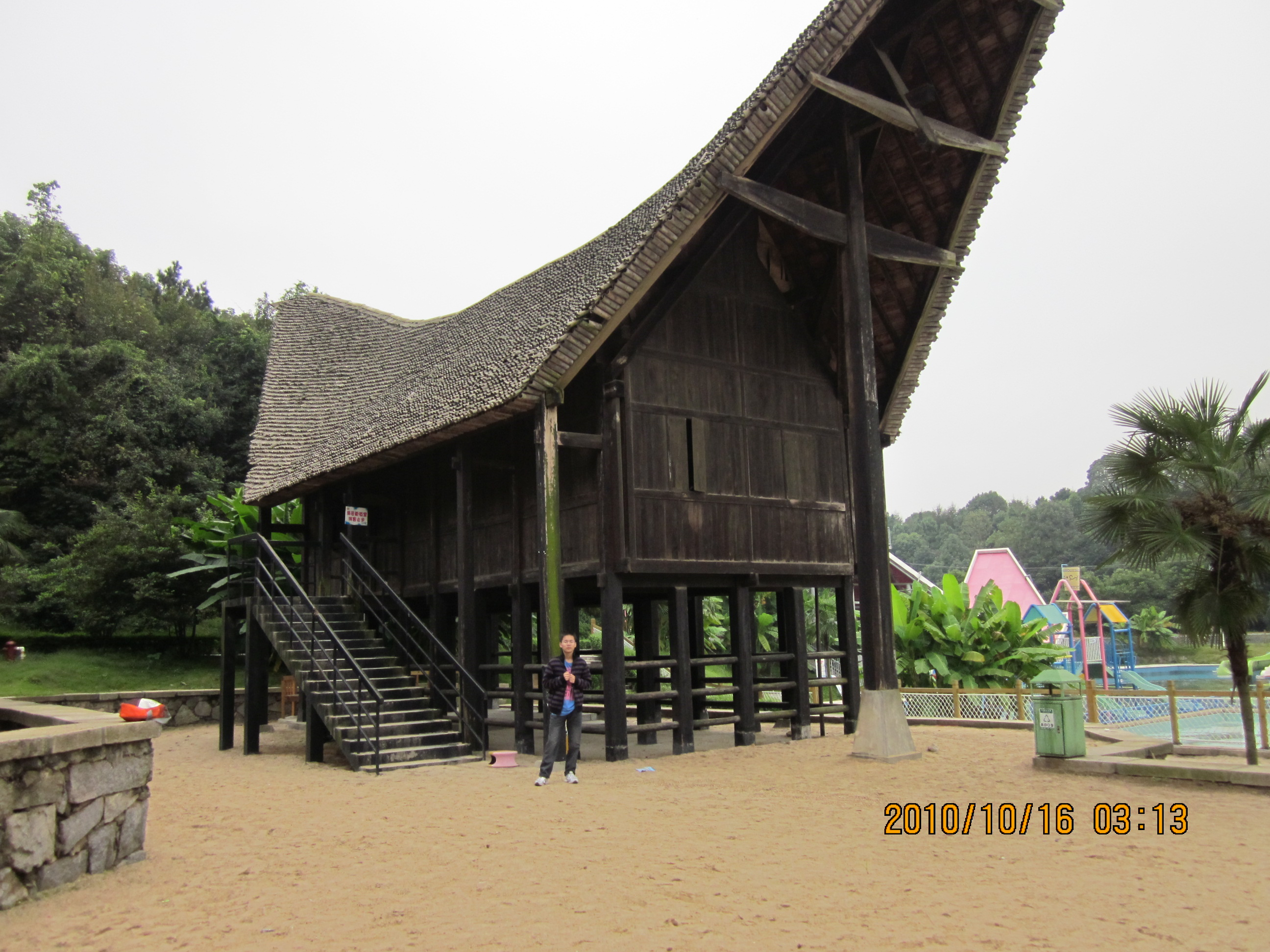
Cambodia

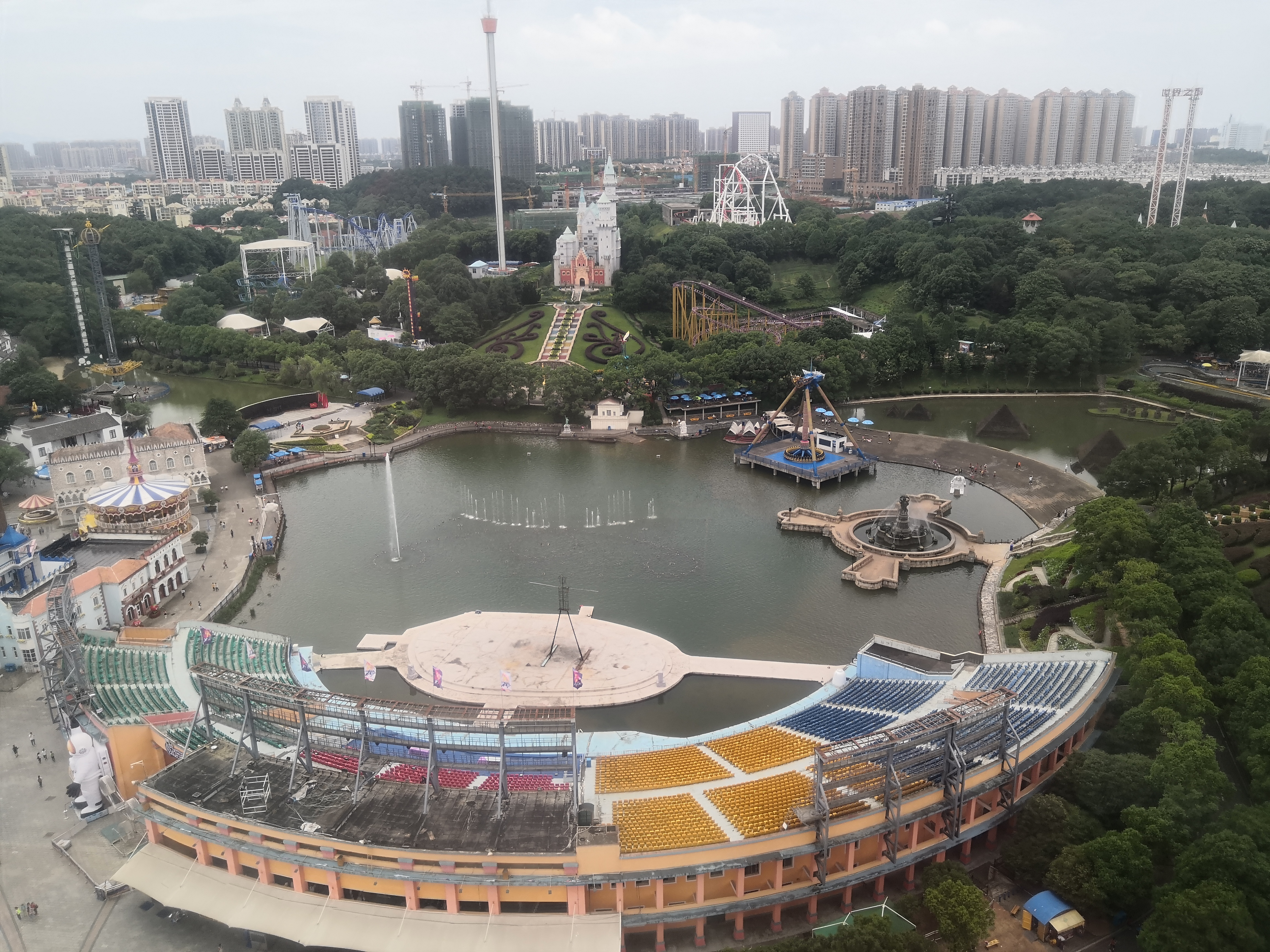
Lake

== See also ==
- List of amusement parks in Asia
