= Objectif Mars =

Launched spinning roller coaster at Futuroscope park

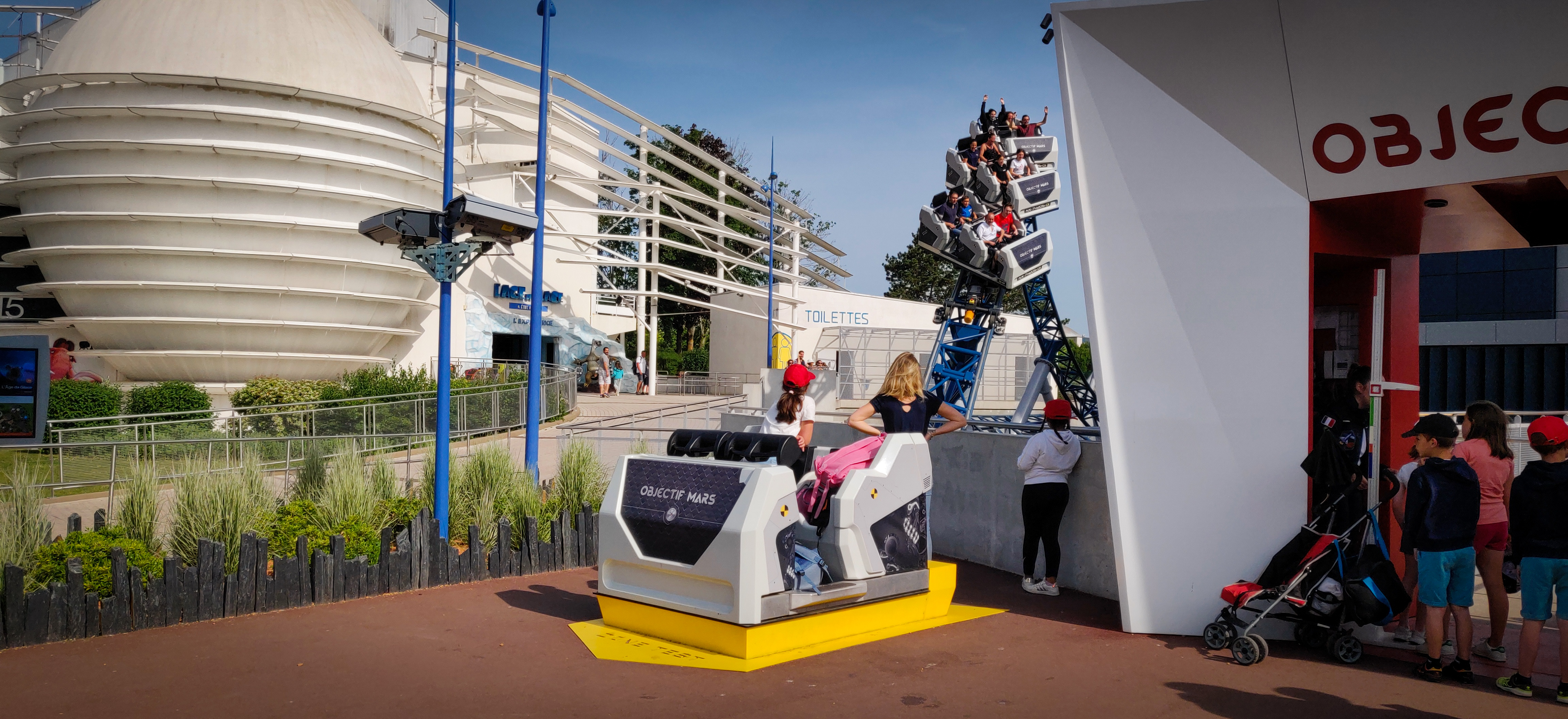

Futuroscope
- Location: Futuroscope
- Coordinates: 46°40′18″N 0°22′13″E
- Status: Operating
- Opening date: 13 June 2020
- Cost: €22,000,000
- Replaced: Pavillon de Solido

General statistics
- Type: Steel – Spinning – Launched
- Manufacturer: Intamin
- Designer: Daniel Schoppen
- Lift/launch system: 2 Tire propelled launches
- Length: 1,640.4 ft (500.0 m)
- Speed: 34.2 mph (55.0 km/h)
- Inversions: 0
- Duration: 2:50
- Capacity: 1000 riders per hour
- Height restriction: 43 in (109 cm)
- Trains: 4 trains with 3 cars. Riders are arranged 2 across in 2 rows for a total of 12 riders per train.
- Website: Official website
- Objectif Mars at RCDB

Objectif Mars is a steel multi-launched spinning coaster located at Futuroscope in Chasseneuil-du-Poitou, France. The coaster combines elements of a dark ride and educational technology in order to simulate a daring training session and mission to Mars. It can accommodate children as young as 5–6 years old, provided that they meet the 1.1-metre (43 in) height requirement. Following an April 2023 incident in which part of the train combusted into flames, the spinning cars function was removed from the coaster. As of August 2025, the spinning cars have returned.

== History ==
The concept of Objectif Mars was first brought to light in 1985, when esteemed park architect Denis Laming first brought up a pavilion named the Cœur Ludique de la Galaxie (translation; Playful Heart of the Galaxy), which would have featured a roller coaster themed to letting riders experience space travel. This was ultimately never realized, but would be brought to light decades later.

After 24 years of operation, on 27 August 2017, the Pavillon de Solido and its residing Explorarium IMAX theatre was permanently closed. The following month, in October 2017, Futuroscope manager Dominique Hummel announced the construction of the park's first full-fledged roller coaster, which was confirmed to be a themed experience and represent a solid €22,000,000, making it the park's largest investment since their inception in 1987. During late 2018/early 2019 the coaster began construction under the working title Mission Kepler, in reference to the Kepler space telescope or Kepler's laws of planetary motion. It was also confirmed to be a product from Liechtenstein-based firm Intamin, who had showcased renderings for similar attractions at the Euro Attractions Show (EAS) 2017.

On 2 September 2019 Futuroscope formally announced the attraction, in the form of Objectif Mars (translation; Mission Mars), a family-friendly spinning coaster featuring a drop track and various effects. The park had previously considered several names for the ride, such as Mars Challenge, Mars G-Force, and Mars 2040; the resulting name was chosen from a vote on park owner Compagnie des Alpes's website.

Objectif Mars was originally expected to open on 28 March 2020, but was delayed when the COVID-19 pandemic forced the park to shut down that month. Futuroscope was able to reopen three months later, on 13 June 2020, and Objectif Mars was finally able to open as well.

== Ride experience ==
The ride departs the station into the dark ride section of the coaster, passing through several scenes training them for their mission before blasting into hyperspace on a show screen. Exiting the building, the ride makes a 90° turn into the first of two tire propelled launches, enabling riders to reach their max speed of 34.2 mph (55.0 km/h), as well as letting the cars spin freely throughout the layout. The train navigates a curved airtime hill, a valley below the ride entrance, and a turnaround before hitting the second tunneled tire propelled launch. The coaster navigates a short section of simple airtime hills and curves before hitting the brakes, and re-entering the building. A sudden 5-metre (16 ft) drop track sends riders into a brief freefall, before making a final left hand turn into the station platform.

== Characteristics ==
=== Statistics ===
Objectif Mars has a total track length of 1,640 feet (500 m) and can hit a top speed of 34.2 mph (55.0 km/h) via the usage of a pair of tire propelled launches. It is primarily located inside of and around a 1,850m² building, although the building mainly houses the queue, station, transfer track, drop track, and dark ride portion. The coaster's keeps its height low to the ground, as that is not the focus of the attraction.

Objectif Mars runs with up to four 12-passenger trains. These each have three cars that can each carry 2 passengers in 2 rows. Each train weighs approximately 5.5 tonnes, and each car is able to spin freely throughout the layout, although the motion is controlled during the dark ride section and first launch.

On top of everything, Objectif Mars features a 5-metre (16 ft) drop track, the first of its kind in France. The element consists of an upright piece of track, which one loaded with a train can freefall to a lower level. The element can be found on coasters such as Hagrid's Magical Creatures Motorbike Adventure at Universal's Islands of Adventure, TH13TEEN at Alton Towers, and Verbolten at Busch Gardens Williamsburg.

=== Theme ===
Objectif Mars is themed to a space training centre and mission. The physical resistance of riders is tested against controlled amounts of g-forces, heat, electromagnetic fields, and weightlessness throughout the ride, in preparation towards a daring mission to the planet Mars.

=== Contractors ===
Intamin was the provider of the coaster hardware and concept. They had first introduced the family-friendly launched spinning coaster concept at the EAS Expo in 2017, complete with drop track and a tilt track. Les Crayons, an Uzès, France-based design firm, assisted with the attraction theming and interactive elements/displays, while the Parisian production company DIKDAK handled the visual programs and video media.

== Incidents ==
On April 7, 2023, at approximately 10:16am, a lithium battery situated on the second carriage of a coaster train caught fire at the end of the course, injuring two riders. Returning to the station in flames, the fire was quickly brought under control by the teams on site. In response, the rotating cars were disabled and the coaster reopened in June 2023.
