= Futuroscope =

Multimedia amusement park in Vienne, Nouvelle-Aquitaine, France

- Previously known as Planète Futuroscope
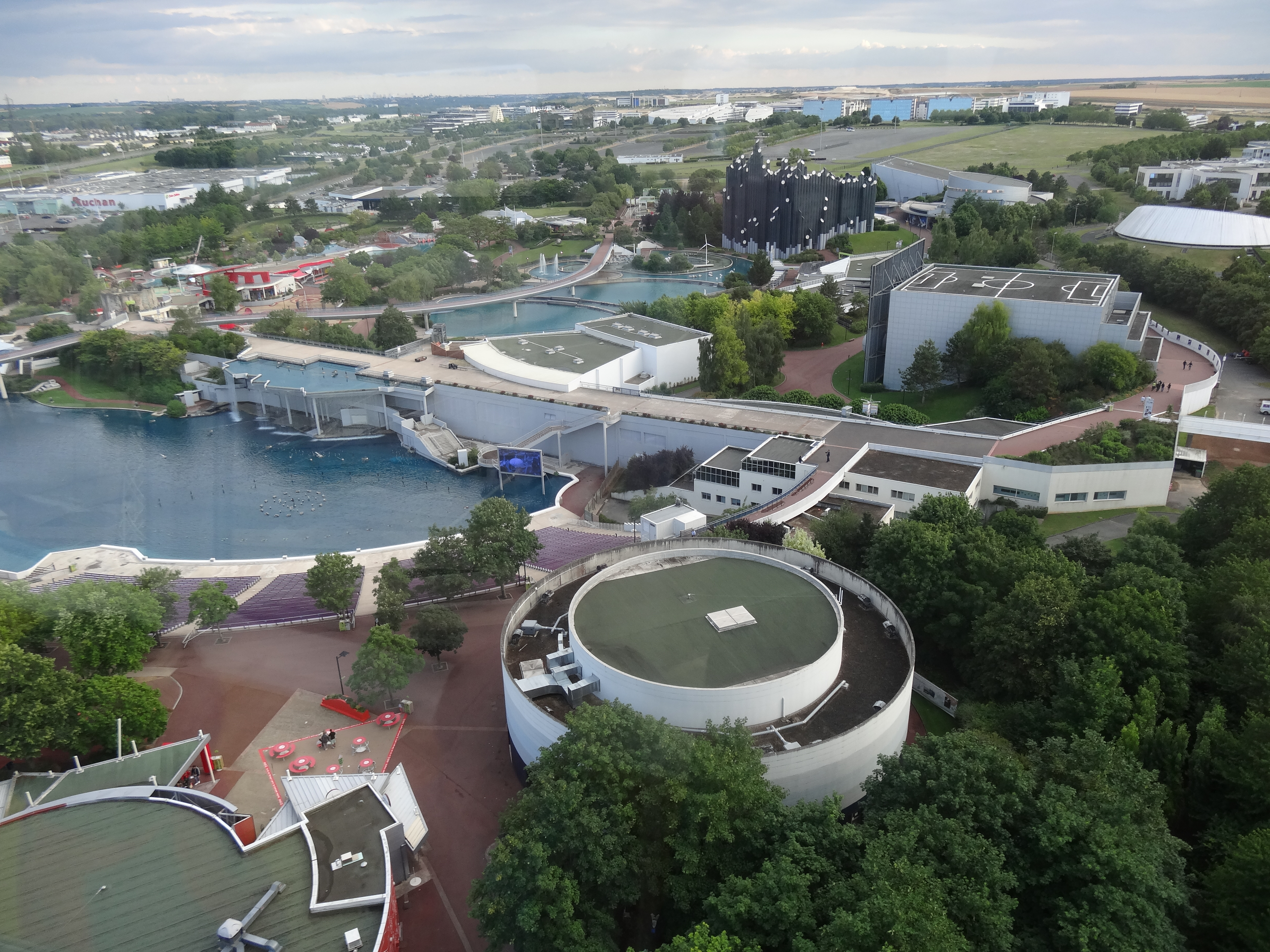
- Futuroscope view from the Gyrotour
- Interactive map of Futuroscope
- Location: Chasseneuil-du-Poitou and Jaunay-Clan, Nouvelle-Aquitaine, France
- Coordinates: 46°40′09″N 0°22′08″E
- Opened: May 31, 1987
- Owner: Compagnie des Alpes
- Slogan: Toutes les forces d'attractions
- Operating season: February to December
- Area: 131 acres (0.53 km^{2})
- Website: www.futuroscope.com/en/

Futuroscope, or Parc du Futuroscope (French pronunciation: [paʁk dy fytyʁɔskɔp]), formerly known as Planète Futuroscope, is a French theme park based upon multimedia, cinematographic, and audiovisual techniques. It has several 3D cinemas and a few 4D cinemas along with other attractions and shows, some of which are the only examples in the world.

It is located in the department of Vienne, Nouvelle-Aquitaine, 10 kilometres (6.2 mi) north of Poitiers, in the communes of Chasseneuil-du-Poitou and Jaunay-Clan.

The park had 1.83 million visitors in 2015. In total, 50 million visitors have been to the park since it opened in 1987.

== History ==
- 1984: 11 December, first stone placed by René Monory, president of the general council of Vienne.
- 1987: 31 May, opens to the public with Kinémax, the Pavillon du Futuroscope and a play zone.
- 1988: opening of the first Dynamique Cinéma - Monde des Enfants (the world of children) and the Showscan (the first part of the Pavillon de la Communication).
- 1989: the Cinéma en Relief, the Cinéma 360° and the second part of the Pavillon de la Communication open, offering new spectacles to visitors.
- 1990: opening of the Omnimax and the Gyrotour. Futuroscope produces its first film in 360° about the Tour de France. 1990 Tour de France begins at the Futuroscope.
- 1991: inauguration of Cinéautomate in spring. The park receives its one-millionth visitor.
- 1992: the Tapis Magique (Magic Carpet) and the Paysages d’Europe (Landscapes of Europe, a tow boat ride) open.
- 1993: inauguration of Solido.
- 1994: opening of Pavillon de la Vienne, a second Dynamique Cinéma and the Aquascope.
- 1995: celebrating the centenary of cinema, inauguration of the Images Studio.
- 1996: the IMAX 3D opens and presents Guillaumet, les Ailes du Courage (the Wings of Courage), a 3D dramatic film in 3D directed by Jean-Jacques Annaud. The Showscan becomes the Cinéma Haute Résolution (High Resolution Cinema).
- 1997: Futuroscope celebrates its 10th anniversary with a new evening spectacle, Le Lac aux Images (the Lake with Images). The Cinéautomate becomes Ciné-Jeu (Cinema Game) and Cyber Avenue opens up the Cyberworld to its visitors. The Pavillon de la Communication presents a film produced by Futuroscope called Les Autoroutes de l’Information (The Motorways of Information).
- 1998: Cyber Avenue expands with Cybermédia offering 1600 m² (17,000 sq ft) of multimedia, Internet and video games. Imagic opens, mixing image with illusion. The Dynamique Cinéma 2 becomes Astratour with a film discovering satellites, produced by Futuroscope.
- 1999: opening of Images du Goût (Images of Taste) and The Workshop of Taste in the Pavillon du Futuroscope.
- 2000: opening of the IMAX 3D simulator: Le Défi d’Atlantis (Race for Atlantis). In June, the Gare TGV-Futuroscope (Futuroscope's TGV Station) opened with a walkway allowing visitors to reach the heart of the park directly from the station (80 mins from Paris-Montparnasse).

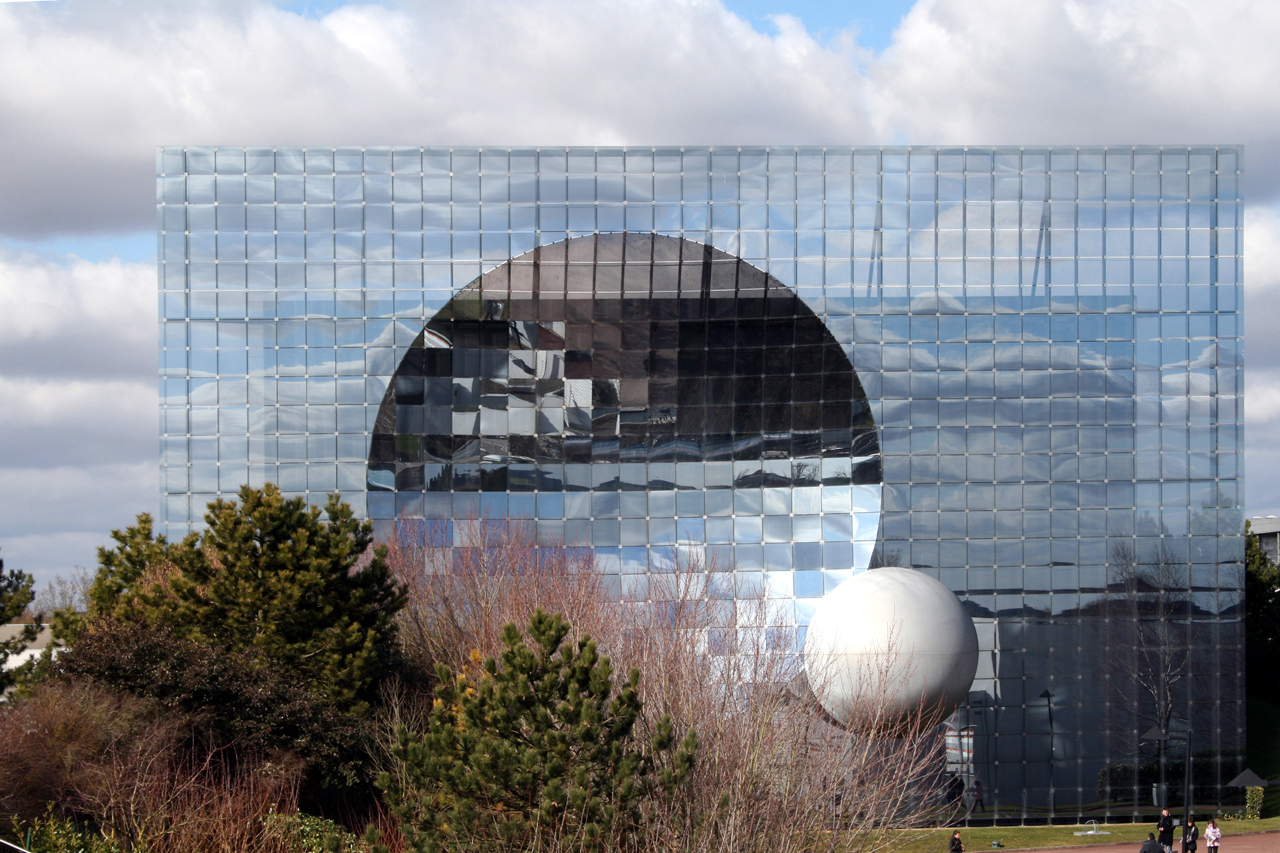
L'Imax 3D

- 2001: the inauguration of the new attractions: CyberWorld', OceanOasis, Superstition and Métropole Défi (Metropolis Challenge). On 18 April, Futuroscope welcomed its 25 millionth visitor.
- 2002: opening of Destination Cosmos, a new evening spectacle conceived by Yves Pépin: Le Miroir d’Uranie (the Mirror of Uranie) and two new films: Sur les traces du Panda (China: The Panda Adventure) and Plongeurs sans Limite (Divers Without Limits).
- 2003: opening of the attraction La Cité du Numérique (the Digital City); 2 IMAX films: Space Station 3D and Percussions du Monde (Pulse: A Stomp Odyssey); 2 dynamique films: Les mélodies Aquatiques (Aquatic Melodies); and 2 new spectacles: Les Grandes Illusions (The Great Illusions), the Pavillon de la Créativité and an open air photograph exhibition.
- 2004: the season begins with a festival of the best Imax films. Jacques Perrin produces an exclusive new film for Tapis Magique, Voyageurs du Ciel et de la Mer (Travellers by Air and by Sea). Le Rêve d’Icare (Adrenaline Rush) produces new sensations in the Imax cinema.
- 2005: the arrival of many new attractions: Star du Futur ! (Star of the Future!); La Légende de l'Étalon Noir (The Young Black Stallion) in the Kinémax; the dynamique film Péril sur Akryls (Danger on Akryls) in Dynamique 1 and Les Yeux Grands Fermés (Journey into the Dark). On 27 April, the park welcomed its 30-millionth visitor, making it the second most visited theme park in France and the fifth in Europe.
- 2006: a new 3D film opens in Imax 3D, le Seigneur du Ring (Adventures in Animation 3D). This year, the Park is themed as the Year of the Robots, by opening on 5 April with Dances with Robots in the new House of the Robots. A new evening spectacle entitled the Forest of the Dreams also forms part of the theme.
- 2007: two new IMAX films, Expédition Nil Bleu (Mystery of the Nile), Sous les Mers du Monde 3D (Deep Sea 3D), and a new version of the dynamic film La Vienne Dynamique.
- 2008: a new attraction based around the BBC's programme The Future is Wild, a new Omnimax film (Dinosaurs), a new dynamic film (Laponie Express). On 10 July, the park welcomed its 35 millionth visitor.
- 2015: Cirque du Soleil announced a partnership with Futuroscope and will produce a new show called 'La Forge aux étoiles' to replace the 'Lady O' evening show. The show will premier on 6 February 2016 and perform 250-300 shows a year.

Futuroscope currently employs 600 people, including 400 temporary staff. Stages of the Tour de France cycle race have begun and ended at the park several times since its opening.

== Architecture ==
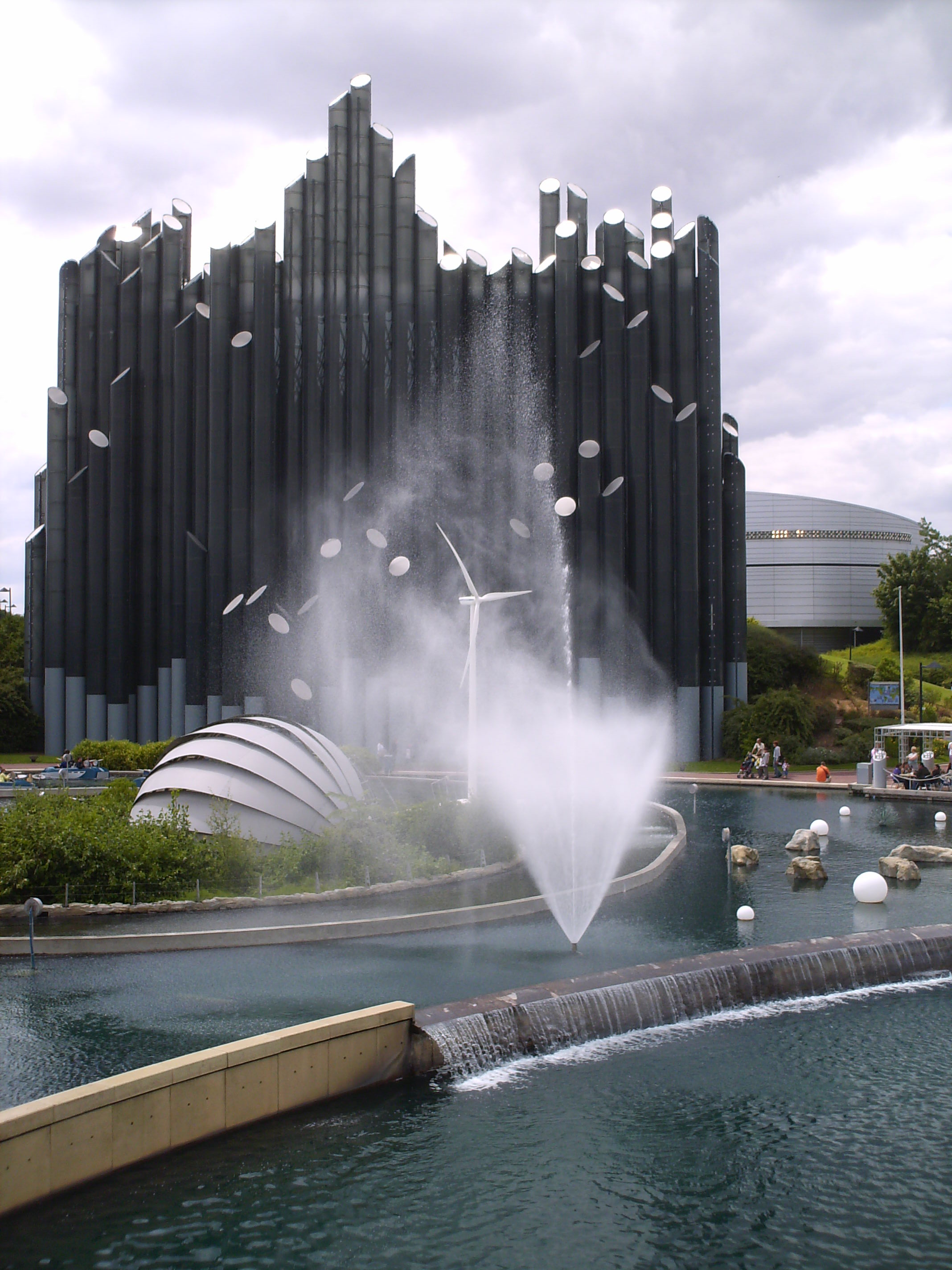
The 'Tapis Magique' (The Extraordinary Journey)

The pavilions of Futuroscope are mainly constructed of metal and glass, and their design was led by architect Denis Laming.

- 1987: Le Pavillon du Futuroscope, Le Kinémax
- 1988: Le Cinéma Dynamique 1, Le Pavillon de la Communication
- 1989: Le 360°, le Cinéma en Relief (the latter removed in 2004)
- 1990: L’Omnimax, la Gyrotour
- 1991: Le Cinéautomate
- 1992: Le Tapis Magique
- 1993: Le Solido (removed in 2017)
- 1994: Le Pavillon de la Vienne, le Cinéma Dynamique 2, l’Aquascope
- 1995: Images Studio
- 1996: L’Imax 3D
- 2000: L’Imax 3D Dynamique, TGV-Futuroscope station
- 2002: Destination Cosmos (formerly Aquascope)
- 2006: Le Pavillon des Robots (Dances with Robots)
- 2008: Les Animaux du Futur (today: La Machine à Voyager dans le Temps)
- 2020: Objectif Mars
- 2022: Chasseur de tornades
- 2024: Rename to Futuroscope expérience and opening of Aquascope (water Park)

== Attractions ==
N°	Attraction	Description	Length
1	La Machine à Voyager dans le Temps (The Time Machine)	Dark ride based on the game Raving Rabbids: Travel in Time featuring the Raving Rabbids	6 mins
2	La Vienne Dynamique (Dynamic Vienne)	Dynamic movie theatre with added effects	12 mins
3	Chocs Cosmiques (Cosmic Collisions)	Planetarium dome movie theatre	23 mins
4	L'Extraordinaire Voyage (The Extraordinary Journey)	Europe's first Flying Theater by Dynamic Attractions	4 mins
5	Astra Fun Xperiences	Sport and video games	-
6	Dynamic!	Dynamic movie theatre	5 mins
8	IllusiO, un destin magique	Magic show	25 mins
9	Sébastien Loeb Racing Xperience	Dynamic movie theatre with virtual reality headsets	3 mins
10	La Clé des Songes	Evening show	22 mins
11	Cyber Avenue	Amusement arcade	-
12	La Gyrotour	Observation tower	7 mins
13	Dans les yeux de Thomas Pesquet (Through Thomas Pesquet's eyes)	IMAX Laser 4K movie theatre	22 mins
14	Les Yeux Grands Fermés (Journey into the Dark)	Walk-through in the dark	20 mins
15	L'Âge de Glace, l'Expérience 4D (Ice Age, the 4-D Experience)	4D movie theatre	11 mins
16	Kinékid	3D movie theatre	12 mins
17	Objectif Mars	Intamin launched spinning roller coaster	2 mins
18	Chasseurs de Tornades	Dynamic movie theatre with added effects	5 mins
19	Arthur, l'Aventure 4D (Arthur, the 4D Adventure)	Dynamic 4D movie theatre with IMAX Dome	5 mins
20	Danse avec les Robots (Dances with Robots)	RoboCoaster	2 mins
21	Le Monde de l'invisible (Mysteries of the Unseen World)	IMAX Dome	25 mins
22	Futuropolis	21 outdoor games	-

== Restaurants and shops ==
The park has eight full-service restaurants and ten restaurations rapides (Illico Resto). There are eight shops, most of which are located at the entrance.
