= Wild River Country =

Former water park in North Little Rock, Arkansas

- Interactive map of Wild River Country
- Slogan: Arkansas' Largest Water Park "Everyone's a ten!"
- Location: North Little Rock, Arkansas, U.S.
- Coordinates: 34.818101°N 92.342620°W
- Opened: 1985; 41 years ago
- Closed: 2020; 6 years ago
- Operating season: Memorial Day — Labor Day
- Area: 26 acres (11 ha)
- Water slides: 12 water slides

Wild River Country was an outdoor water park located in North Little Rock, Arkansas, United States. It was a popular attraction of the city and saw many visitors from all over the region. Marketed as being the largest water park in the state of Arkansas, it was unable to open for the 2020 season due to unpaid taxes, and was sold at auction.

== Attractions ==
- Lazy River
- Water slides
- Wave pool area
- Kiddy play area, with small slides, water blasters & water falls
- Sand Volleyball

== Specialty rides ==
- Cyclone, two-, three-, or four-person raft ride
- Vertigo, vortex water slide
- Pipeline, two-person roller coaster-style ride
- Sidewinder, 200-foot (61 m) serpentine ride
- Accelerator, vertical high-speed slide
- Wild River Rapids, a five level ride
- Vortex, a black-covered body ride
- Black Lightning and White Lightning, twin body rides sharing a launch platform
- AquaLoop, looping body slide

== Closing ==
A news article posted online in February 2020 stated that the park was to be auctioned off after having over five years of unpaid taxes totaling over $282,000. Calls to the phone number listed on the website were met with a busy signal, the official Facebook page was deleted and the park's website was no longer working.
