= Happy Valley Nanjing =

Theme park in Nanjing, Jiangsu, China

- Interactive map of Happy Valley Nanjing
- Location: Nanjing, Jiangsu, China
- Coordinates: 32.155354°N 118.993175°E
- Status: Operating
- Opened: November 11, 2020

Attractions
- Roller coasters: 5

Happy Valley Nanjing is a theme park in Qixia District, Nanjing, Jiangsu, China. Opened on November 11, 2020, it is the eighth installation of the Happy Valley theme park chain.

== Notable rides ==
Name	Type	Manufacturer	Model	Opened	Other statistics
FamilyBoomerang RollerCoaster	Steel	Vekoma	Family Boomerang	2020	Operating
Forest Predator	Steel	Bolliger & Mabillard	Wing Coaster	2020	Operating
Light of Revenge	Steel	Intamin	Blitz Coaster	2020	Operating
Mine Escape	Steel	Golden Horse	Mine Coaster	2020	Operating
Suspended Family Coaster	Steel	Vekoma	Suspended Family Coaster	2020	Operating
