= Happily =

Happily may refer to:

- Happily (film), an American comedy thriller
- Happily (horse), a racehorse
- "Happily" (song), by One Direction

== See also ==
- Happy (disambiguation)
- Happiness (disambiguation)
