= Happier =

Happier may refer to:

- Happiness, an emotional state

== Music ==
- "Happier" (Ed Sheeran song), 2018
- "Happier" (Marshmello and Bastille song), 2018
- "Happier" (Olivia Rodrigo song), 2021
- Happier?, an album by Volumes, 2021
- Happier, an album by As December Falls, 2021
- Happier, an album by Kid606, 2014
- "Happier", a song by Guster from Lost and Gone Forever, 1999
- "Happier", a song by Paul Anka from The Painter, 1976
- "Happier", a song by SM Town from 2022 Winter SM Town: SMCU Palace, 2022
- "Happier", a song by Yungblud and Oli Sykes of Bring Me the Horizon, 2023

== See also ==
- Happy (disambiguation)
- Happiness (disambiguation)
