= Happy Face =

Happy face or Happy Face may refer to:

- Smiley, a simple cartoon representation of a smiling face

== Brands ==
- Happy Faces, a brand of British biscuit made by Jacob's Bakery
- Happy Face Entertainment, a Korean entertainment company

== Film and television ==
- Happy Face (film), a 2018 Canadian drama by Alexandre Franchi
- Happy Face (TV series), a 2025 American true crime drama series
- Happy Face, a 2017 comedy special by Ryan Hamilton

== Music ==
- Happy Face, a 2006 album by Kim McLean
- Happy Face Records, a label set up by British band Diamond Head

=== Songs ===
- "Happy Face" (song), by Treaty Oak Revival, 2025
- "Happy Face", by Con Funk Shun from Spirit of Love, 1980
- "Happy Face", by Destiny's Child from Survivor, 2001
- "Happy Face", by Jagwar Twin, 2020
- "Happy Face", by Tate McRae from All the Things I Never Said, 2020
- "Happy Face", by the Toadies from Rubberneck, 1994
- "Happy Face", by Ya-kyim, 2009

== Other uses ==
- Happy Face Hill, a landmark in Simi Valley, California, U.S.
- Galle (Martian crater), or 'happy face crater'
- Keith Hunter Jesperson (born 1955), Canadian-American serial killer known as the "Happy Face Killer"
- Theridion grallator, or happy-face spider

== See also ==
- Happiness
- Put On a Happy Face (disambiguation)
