= Hapy =

Hapy can refer to:

- Hapi (Nile god), an Egyptian river god
- Hapy, an Egyptian funerary deity

== See also ==
- Apis (deity), also spelled Hapis, an Egyptian god worshipped in Mem
- Happy (disambiguation)
