= Happy Song =

Happy Song or The Happy Song may refer to:

- "Happy Song" (Baby's Gang song), 1983
- "Happy Song" (Bring Me the Horizon song), 2015
- "The Happy Song" (Imogen Heap song), 2016

For songs with the title "Happy", see the Songs section of Happy (disambiguation).
