= Treaty Oak Revival =

US country/southern rock band from Odessa, Texas

- Origin: Odessa, Texas, U.S.
- Genres: Country rock; Southern rock; red dirt; punk rock
- Years active: 2018–present
- Label: TOR
- Members: Sam Canty; Lance Vanley; Jeremiah Vanley; Cody Holloway; Dakota Hernandez
- Past members: Andrew Carey
- Website: treatyoakrevival.com

Treaty Oak Revival is an American country rock band based in Odessa, Texas. They have self-released three studio albums and five singles since 2018.

== History ==
Treaty Oak Revival formed as a cover band in Odessa, Texas in 2018, originally consisting of lead singer Sam Canty, guitarists Lance Vanley and Jeremiah Vanley, bassist Andrew Carey and drummer Cody Holloway. Jeremiah and Lance Vanley are uncle and nephew, respectively.

The band is named after the Treaty Oak in Austin, Texas. The tree is supposedly the last of what was originally a grove of 14 oak trees that were considered a sacred meeting place by the Comanche and Tonkawa. They released their debut single, "No Vacancy", in 2020 before releasing their debut studio album with the same name in 2021. Their second studio album, Have a Nice Day, was released in November 2023. The album debuted at number 174 on the Billboard 200, and included the song "Missed Call", which became the band's first gold record in 2024. By 2025, "Missed Call" had gone platinum and several other songs by the band had received certifications.

On February 6, 2024, the band played the Grand Ole Opry, accompanied by Rhonda Vincent and Henry Cho. A few months later, the band accompanied Koe Wetzel on his Damn Near Normal Tour.

In 2025 the band released "Bad State of Mind", which was noted for its midwest emo riff and became the band's highest charting song, reaching number 1 on Billboard's Bubbling Under chart. On April 21, 2025 the band performed "Bad State of Mind" on Jimmy Kimmel Live. In May of that year Treaty Oak Revival released The Talco Tapes, an acoustic album consisting of eight previously recorded songs and a cover of "Name" by Goo Goo Dolls. On June 29, 2025, bassist Andrew Carey departed from the band, citing physical and mental strain stemming from touring.

In October 2025 the band made their debut international performance at the Hordern Pavilion, Sydney, Australia, as the first part of their four-stop ‘Treaty Oak Revival Takes Australia’ headline tour. In November of that year the band released West Texas Degenerate, which reached number 21 on the Billboard 200, and number 1 on Billboard's Top Rock Albums and Americana/Folk Albums charts.

== Style ==
Treaty Oak Revival's music has variably been described as country rock, Southern rock, red dirt, or punk rock. Singer Sam Canty describes the band as a "rock band with a country accent", while one of their booking agents has dubbed them "as much a punk rock band as they are a country band". Stephen Thomas Erlewine of AllMusic noted that the band expands their "earthy red-dirt country sound with a hefty dose of post-grunge crunch". While the Houston Press' Clint Hale agreed that the band were both a rock and country band, he also stated that the group were set apart from country artists such as Morgan Wallen and Luke Combs by juxtaposing country-themed lyrical content such as "working oil rigs and building gas plants, abusing various substances and courting an array of morally questionable characters" with music that "rocks way too hard to fall straight within the country vein."

Aside from post-grunge, Canty stated the band takes influence from singers and bands including Cross Canadian Ragweed, David Allan Coe, Randy Rogers Band, Lynyrd Skynyrd, Blink-182, and William Clark Green. Lance Vanley also named heavy metal influences such as Van Halen, Pantera, and Metallica, which became more apparent on West Texas Degenerate.

== Members ==
=== Current ===
- Sam Canty – vocals, acoustic guitar (2018–present)
- Lance Vanley – vocals, rhythm guitar (2018–present)
- Jeremiah Vanley – lead guitar (2018–present)
- Cody Holloway – drums (2018–present)
- Dakota Hernandez – bass guitar (2025–present)

=== Previous ===
- Andrew Carey – bass guitar (2018–2025)

== Discography ==
=== Studio albums ===
List of studio albums, with selected chart positions
Title	Details	Peak chart positions	Certifications
Title	Details	US	Certifications
No Vacancy	Released: January 29, 2021; Formats: Digital download, streaming, vinyl	147	RIAA: Gold
Have a Nice Day	Released: November 24, 2023; Formats: Digital download, streaming, vinyl	174	RIAA: Gold
West Texas Degenerate	Released: November 28, 2025; Formats: Digital download, streaming	21	

=== Singles ===
List of singles, with selected chart positions
Title	Year	Peak chart positions				Certifications	Album
Title	Year	US Bub.	US Country	US Rock	CAN	Certifications	Album
"No Vacancy"	2020	—	—	—	—	RIAA: 2× Platinum	No Vacancy
"Leaving Hell"	2021	—	—	—	—		Non-album singles
"Stay Tuned"	2022	—	—	—	—		Non-album singles
"Happy Face"	2024	11	30	23	—	RIAA: Gold	West Texas Degenerate
"Bad State of Mind"	2025	1	19	10	96	RIAA: Platinum	West Texas Degenerate

=== As featured artist ===
List of singles as featured artist, with title, year released, and album shown
Title	Year	Peak chart positions		Album
Title	Year	US Bub.	US Rock	Album
"Throw Away" (Sterling Elza featuring Treaty Oak Revival)	2023	—	—	Simpler Days
"12 Steps" (Dexter and the Moonrocks featuring Treaty Oak Revival)	2026	14	25	Friends That I Don't Like

=== Other charted and certified songs ===
Title	Year	Peak chart positions		Certifications	Album
Title	Year	US Bub.	US Cou.	Certifications	Album
"Irish Goodbye”	2021	—	—	RIAA: Gold	No Vacancy
"Ode to Bourbon"	2021	—	—	RIAA: Platinum	No Vacancy
"Missed Call"	2021	—	—	RIAA: 3× Platinum	No Vacancy
"One Time Thing"	2021	—	—	RIAA: Gold	No Vacancy
"In Between"	2023	—	—	RIAA: Platinum	Have a Nice Day
"Wrong Place Wrong Time"	2023	—	—	RIAA: Gold	Have a Nice Day
"Stop & Stare"	2023	—	45	RIAA: Platinum	Have a Nice Day
"Have a Nice Day"	2023	—	—	RIAA: Platinum	Have a Nice Day
"I'm the Worst"	2023	—	—	RIAA: Platinum	Have a Nice Day
"See You in Court"	2023	—	—	RIAA: Gold	Have a Nice Day
"Fishnets"	2023	—	—	RIAA: Gold	Have a Nice Day
"Port A"	2025	16	36		West Texas Degenerate
"West Texas Degenerate" (featuring William Clark Green)	2025	24	38		West Texas Degenerate
"Shit Hill"	2025	15	35		West Texas Degenerate
"Withdrawals" (featuring Gannon Fremin and CCRev)	2025	20	35		West Texas Degenerate
"Misery" (featuring Muscadine Bloodline)	2025	10	30		West Texas Degenerate
"Stay a While"	2025	—	48		West Texas Degenerate
"Sunflower"	2025	—	45		West Texas Degenerate

== Awards ==
Year	Award	Category	Result	Ref.
2025	Academy of Country Music Awards	New Duo or Group of the Year	Nominated	
2025	Academy of Country Music Awards	Album of the Year	Nominated	
2024	Texas Country Music Awards	Roots/Alternative Artist or Band of the Year	Nominated	
