= Le bonheur =

Le bonheur (French for "happiness") may refer to:

- Le Bonheur (1934 film), a 1934 French film
- Le Bonheur (1965 film), a 1965 French film
- Le Bonheur (Storm Large album), 2014
- Le Bonheur (Brigitte Fontaine and Areski Belkacem album), 1975
- Le Bonheur Children's Hospital, Memphis, Tennessee, U.S.
- Le bonheur de vivre, a painting by Henri Matisse

== See also ==
- Bonheur (disambiguation)
- Happiness (disambiguation)
