= Happy (disambiguation) =

To be happy is to experience happiness.

Happy may also refer to:

== Places ==
- Happy, Kentucky, an unincorporated community
- Happy, Texas, a town
- Happy Isles, Yosemite National Park, California
- Happy Township, Graham County, Kansas

== People ==
- Happy (nickname), a list of people
- Happy (video game player) (born 1991), French Counter-Strike player Vincent Cervoni Schopenhauer
- Happy Hall (born 1987), Bahamian international footballer
- Happy Hogan (baseball) (1877–1915), American baseball player
- Happy Jankell (born 1993), Swedish actress
- Happy Jele (born 1987), South African footballer
- Happy Pieterse (1942–2013), South African boxer
- Happy Salma (born 1980), Indonesian actress, model and writer
- John H. Happy (1895–1962), American politician from Washington
- Marjorie Happy (1898–1970), American politician from Washington

== Arts, entertainment, and media ==
=== Fictional characters ===
- Happy the Dog, in TV series 7th Heaven
- Happy (manga character), a main character in the Japanese manga series Fairy Tail and Edens Zero
- Protagonist of the World War II film Decision Before Dawn, played by Oskar Werner (codename "Happy")
- Happy, one of the Seven Dwarfs, seen in children's story and Disney film Snow White and the Seven Dwarfs
- Happy, a crocodile from the British animated preschool show Hey Duggee
- Happy, a snow hare in the animated series Tabaluga
- Mr. Happy, a Mr. Men character in Roger Hargreaves' children's book series and its television adaptation, The Mr. Men Show
- Happy Gilmore, from the film of the same name
- Happy Walter Higgenbottom, a dog on the animated TV series The Mighty B!
- Happy Hogan (character), a Marvel Comics Iron Man supporting character
- Happy Kyne, on the TV series Fernwood 2 Night
- Happy Loman, son of Willy Loman in Death of a Salesman
- Happy Lowman, on Kurt Sutter's FX series Sons of Anarchy and Mayans M.C.
- Death Angels (A Quiet Place), or Happy, a fictional alien species in the A Quiet Place film franchise

=== Films ===
- Happy (1933 film), a British movie
- Happy (2006 film), an Indian Telugu-language movie by A. Karunakaran
- Happy (2011 film), an American documentary directed by Roko Belic
- Happy (2015 film), a French movie
- Happi (film), a 2019 Indian movie

=== Literature ===
- Happy! (sports manga), by Naoki Urasawa
- Happy!, a comic-series by Grant Morrison; see Grant Morrison bibliography#Other US publishers
- Mr. Happy, a book title and its titular character, in Roger Hargreaves' children's book series and its television adaptation, The Mr. Men Show

=== Music ===
==== Bands ====
- Happy (band), a Japanese band formed in 2012

==== Albums ====
- Happy (Alexia album), 1999
- Happy (Amy Mastura album), 2009
- Happy (Matthew West album), 2003
- Happy (Real Life album), 1997
- Happy? (Jann Arden album), 1997
- Happy? (Public Image Ltd album), 1987
- Happy, by Jenn Johnson, 2026
- Happy, by Sakurako Ohara, 2015
- Happy (Jin EP), 2024
- Happy, an EP by Circa Waves, 2020

==== Songs ====
- "Happy" (Alexia song), 1999
- "Happy" (Ashanti song), 2002
- "Happy" (Ayiesha Woods song), 2006
- "Happy" (Bump of Chicken song), 2010
- "Happy" (Danny Elfman song), 2020
- "Happy" (Hog Heaven song), 1971
- "Happy" (Koharu Kusumi song), 2007
- "Happy" (Legacy of Sound song), 1993
- "Happy" (Leona Lewis song), 2009
- "Happy" (Lighthouse Family song), 2002
- "Happy" (Marina and the Diamonds song), 2014
- "Happy" (Michael Jackson song), 1973; first recorded by Bobby Darin, 1972
- "Happy" (NF song), 2023
- "Happy" (Pharrell Williams song), 2013
- "Happy" (Rolling Stones song), 1972
- "Happy" (Surface song), 1987
- "Happy" (Taeyeon song), 2020
- "Happy" (Travis song), 1997
- "Happy?" (Mudvayne song), 2005
- "H.A.P.P.Y", 2025, by Jessie J
- "Happy", by Alexandra Stan from Unlocked, 2014
- "Happy", by Best Coast from Crazy for You, 2010
- "Happy", by Brooke Candy, 2019
- "Happy", by Bruce Springsteen from Tracks, 1992
- "Happy", by The Carpenters from Horizon, 1975
- "Happy", by Day6 from Fourever, 2024
- "Happy", by Five for Fighting from Message for Albert, 1997
- "Happy", by Fool's Garden from For Sale, 2000
- "Happy", by The Frames from Burn the Maps, 2004
- "Happy", by Gabbie Hanna from Bad Karma, 2020
- "Happy", by Hardy from The Mockingbird & the Crow, 2023
- "Happy", by Hilary Duff from Dignity, 2007
- "Happy", by Jenny Lewis from Rabbit Fur Coat, 2006
- "Happy", by Julia Michaels from Inner Monologue Part 1, 2019
- "Happy", by Kanye West from Donda 2, 2022
- "Happy", by Kesha from Gag Order, 2023
- "Happy", by Last Dinosaurs from Yumeno Garden, 2018
- "Happy", by Lit from A Place in the Sun, 1999
- "Happy", by Lolly from My First Album, 1999
- "Happy", by Mary Mary from Incredible, 2002
- "Happy", the title song of Happy (Matthew West album), 2003
- "Happy", by Mazzy Star from Among My Swan, 1996
- "Happy", by Mitski from Puberty 2, 2016
- "Happy", by Natasha Bedingfield from Pocketful of Sunshine, 2007
- "Happy", by Ned's Atomic Dustbin from God Fodder, 1991
- "Happy", by Oh Wonder from No One Else Can Wear Your Crown, 2020
- "Happy", by Pink from Hurts 2B Human, 2019
- "Happy", by Public Image Ltd from 9, 1989
- "Happy", the title song of Happy (Real Life album), 1997
- "Happy", by Rick James from Throwin' Down, 1982
- "Happy", by Saving Jane from Girl Next Door, 2005
- "Happy", by Sister Hazel from ...Somewhere More Familiar, 1997
- "Happy", by Slowthai from Ugly, 2023
- "Happy", by Soul Asylum from Say What You Will, Clarence... Karl Sold the Truck, 1984
- "Happy", by Stabbing Westward from Stabbing Westward, 2001
- "Happy", by Steps from Tears on the Dancefloor, 2017
- "Happy", by Tracy Chapman from Let It Rain, 2002
- "(Don't It Make You) Happy", by Liz McClarnon in competition to represent United Kingdom in the Eurovision Song Contest 2007

=== Television ===
- Happy (1960 TV series), an American sitcom
- Happy! (TV series), a 2017–2019 American series based on the comics by Grant Morrison
- "Happy" (Fargo), a 2020 episode
- Happy TV, a Serbian national television network

=== Other media ===
- KBS Happy FM, the nickname of Korean radio station KBS Radio 2

== Computing ==
- Happy Computers, a small company producing disk drive enhancements
- Happy (software), a parser generator written in Haskell

== Animals and food service ==
- Happy (fish), an informal name for a cichlid fish from the tribe Haplochromini, particularly in the aquarium hobby
- Happy the Elephant, an elephant at the Bronx Zoo in New York City that, in 2022, was legally ruled to be not a person
- Happy (dog actor), who played Happy the Dog in TV series 7th Heaven
- Happy, a mascot for McDonald's Happy Meal, first introduced in 2009 in France
- Happy (restaurant), a Bulgarian casual dining restaurant chain

== Other uses ==
- Happy n.v., the company that produces and sells the Happy Cube, a mechanical puzzle
- Happi or Happy, a traditional Japanese coat worn at festivals
- Happy Line, a monorail line in central Shenzhen, China
- Happy number, in mathematics

== See also ==
- Happiness (disambiguation)
- Happy face (disambiguation)
- Happy! (disambiguation)
- Hapi (disambiguation)
- Happy, Happy (Norwegian: Sykt lykkelig), a 2010 Norwegian comedy film
