= Happy Face (song) =

2024 single by Treaty Oak Revival

Single by Treaty Oak Revival

from the album West Texas Degenerate
- Released: September 13, 2024
- Recorded: 2024
- Genre: Country rock
- Length: 3:22
- Label: Self-released
- Songwriters: Andrew Carey; Blake Stiles; Cody Holloway; Jeremiah Vanley; Lance Vanley; Sam Canty
- Producers: Treaty Oak Revival; Taylor Kimball

Treaty Oak Revival singles chronology
"Throw Away" (2023)	"Happy Face" (2024)	"Bad State of Mind" (2025)

"Happy Face" is a song by American southern rock and country rock band Treaty Oak Revival, released on September 13, 2024, as the lead single from their third studio album, West Texas Degenerate (2025).

== Background ==
In May 2024, Treaty Oak Revival debuted the song live at a concert in Salado, Texas. Lead singer Sam Canty told the audience that it was about missing his wife and had not yet been recorded. The track went viral on social media afterward, prompting them to record it.

== Composition ==
The song is composed of guitar, drums and a rock and roll-inspired melody. Lyrically, it details the life of constantly being on the road as a result of touring and missing loved ones.

== Critical reception ==
Sam B of Raised Rowdy described the song as a "typical Treaty Oak Revival banger – the melody that sticks with you, the fantastic songwriting and the pure talent of vocalist Sam Canty and the rest of the group. Once the chorus hits, especially, it hooks you and keeps your head bobbing, as does the energetic drum work and chiming guitar. The production is great and amps up the sound that Treaty Oak has become so prominent with."

== Charts ==
=== Weekly charts ===
Weekly chart performance for "Happy Face"
Chart (2024)	Peak position
US Bubbling Under Hot 100 (Billboard)	11
US Hot Country Songs (Billboard)	30
US Hot Rock & Alternative Songs (Billboard)	23

=== Year-end charts ===
Year-end chart performance for "Happy Face"
Chart (2025)	Position
US Hot Rock & Alternative Songs (Billboard)	68

== Certifications ==
Region	Certification	Certified units/sales
United States (RIAA)	Gold	500,000^{‡}
^{‡} Sales+streaming figures based on certification alone.
