= Happy Valley Shenzhen =

Amusement park in Shenzhen, China

Happy Valley Shenzhen 深圳欢乐谷
- Interactive map of Happy Valley Shenzhen 深圳欢乐谷
- Location: Shenzhen, Guangdong, China
- Coordinates: 22.541574°N 113.973949°E
- Status: Operating
- Opened: October 1, 1998

Attractions
- Roller coasters: 5
- Website: sz.happyvalley.cn

Happy Valley Shenzhen
- Simplified Chinese: 深圳欢乐谷
- Traditional Chinese: 深圳歡樂谷
Transcriptions
Standard Mandarin
- Hanyu Pinyin: Shēnzhèn Huānlè Gǔ
Yue: Cantonese
- Jyutping: Sam1 zan3 fun1 lok6 guk1

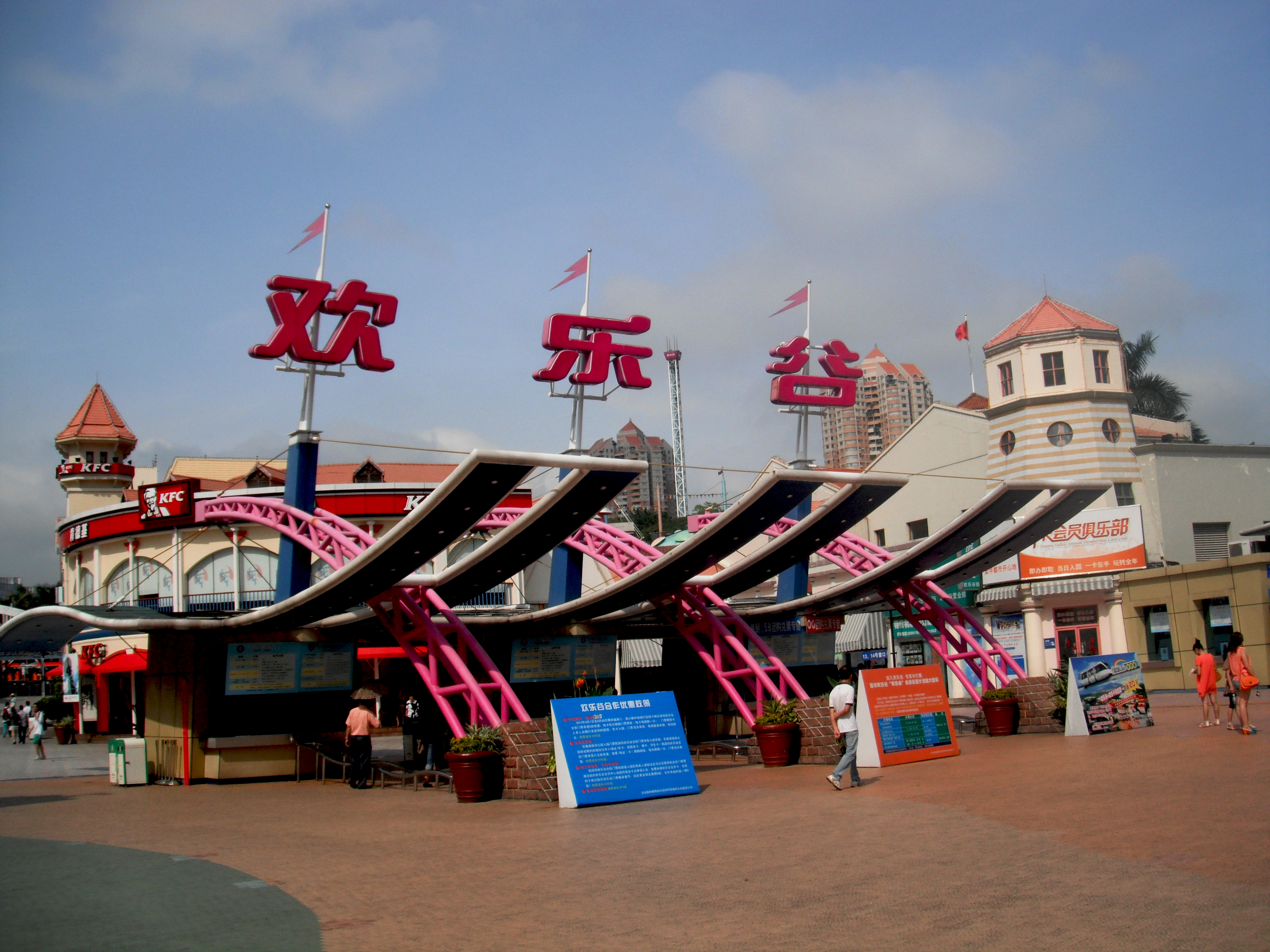
Happy Valley

Happy Valley Shenzhen (Chinese: 深圳欢乐谷) is a theme park in Nanshan District, Shenzhen, Guangdong Province, China.

Opened in 1998, it is the first of the Happy Valley theme park chain. Covering an area of 350,000 square metres (86 acres), the park is composed of nine themed areas including Spanish Square, Cartoon City, Mt. Adventure, Gold Mine Town, Shangri-la Woods, Sunshine Beach, Typhoon Bay, Playa Maya Water Park and Happy Times. The Playa Maya Water Park is open for five months (May to October) each year, and is themed after the Mayan civilization with buildings and statues in Mayan architectural styles. Outside the park a Happy Line monorail train has a stop near the entrance of Happy Valley.

== Notable rides ==
Name	Type	Manufacturer	Model	Opened	Other statistics
Snowy Eagle / Bullet Coaster	Steel – Launched	S&S Worldwide	Air-Launched Coaster	28 July 2012	Height: 196.8 ft (60.0 m); Drop: 221.2 ft (67.4 m); Speed: 83 mph (134 km/h); G-Force: 4.5
Gold Mine Train	Steel – Mine Train	Jinma Rides	Mine Coaster (2x2) - KSC-26K	7 January 2023	Operating
Snow Mountain Flying Dragon	Steel – Inverted	Vekoma	Suspended Looping Coaster (Shenlin)	1 May 2002	Length: 2,202.8 ft (671.4 m); Height: 117.8 ft (35.9 m); Drop: 111.8 ft (34.1 m); Inversions: 4; Speed: 54.9 mph (88.4 km/h); Duration: 1:32; G-Force: 4.7
Power Splash	Steel	Mack Rides	PowerSplash	2019	Operating

== Accidents ==
On October 27, 2023, the train on the Snowy Eagle roller coaster was making its way up the track before it slid back and crashed into another train was unloading passengers. On November 14, 2024, at least 8 people were injured when the Snowy Eagle collided with another train. After the incident, the theme park announced the closure of the park for two days starting on Saturday, in order to conduct a comprehensive safety inspection. In the aftermath of accidents Snowy Eagle and all similar launch coasters in other Happy Valley parks were closed permanently.

=== Defunct Rides ===
Name	Type	Manufacturer	Model	Opened	Closed
Baby Coaster	Steel – Junior	Beijing Shibaolai Amusement Equipment	Big Apple – Wacky Worm	2008	2022
Wild Elfin	Steel – Spinning – Wild Mouse	Golden Horse	Spinning Coaster (ZXC-24A)	2008	31 August 2015
Mine Coaster	Steel – Mine Train	Vekoma	Mine Train (785m)	1 May 2002	28 February 2022

== See also ==
- List of parks in Shenzhen
