= Ken Dodd =

English stand-up comedian and singer (1927–2018)

Sir Ken Dodd OBE
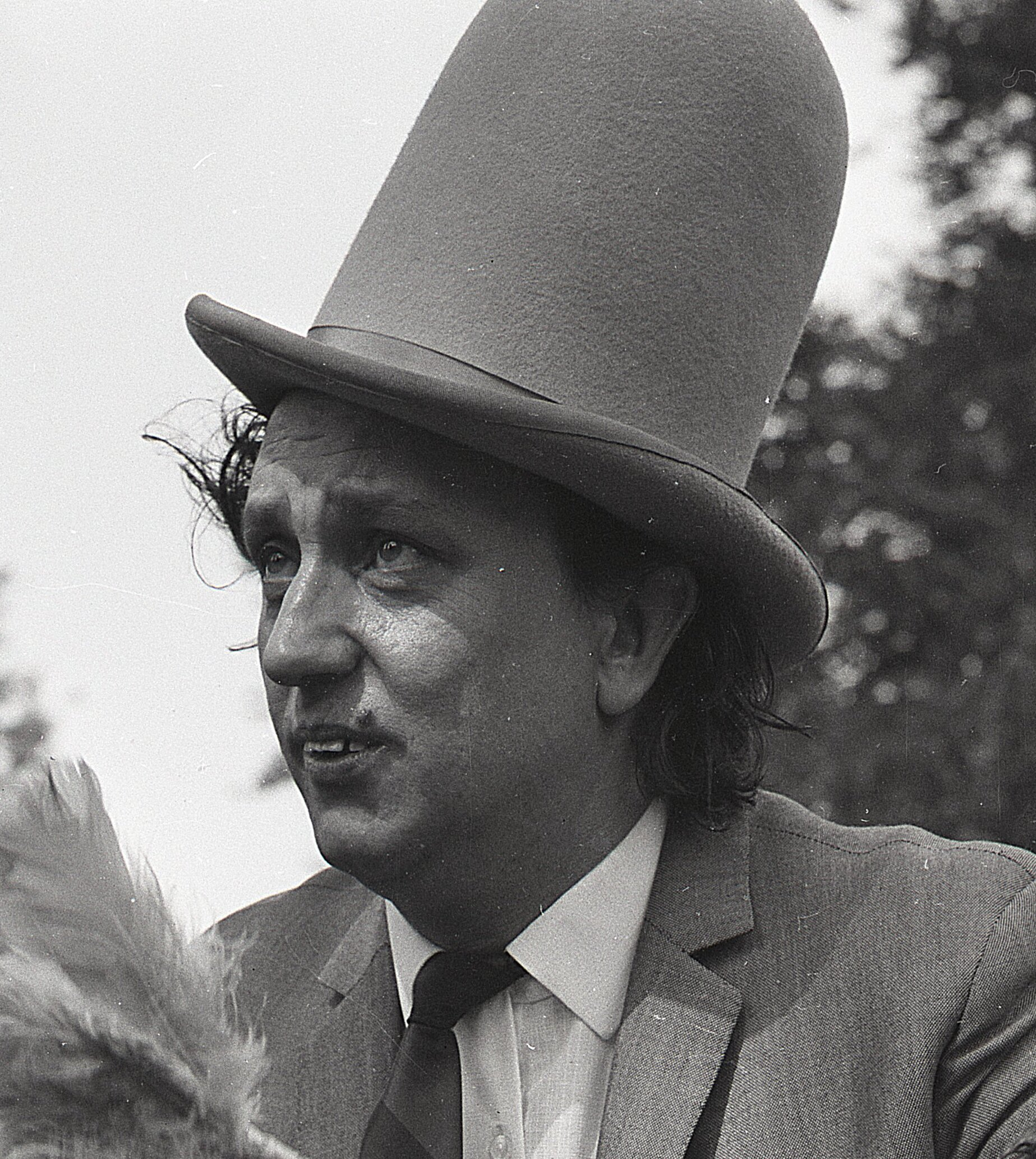
- Dodd in 1968
- Born: Kenneth Arthur Dodd; 8 November 1927; Knotty Ash, Liverpool, England
- Died: 11 March 2018 (aged 90); Knotty Ash, Liverpool, England
- Resting place: Allerton Cemetery, Allerton, Liverpool, Merseyside, England
- Spouse: Anne Jones (m. 2018)

Comedy career
- Years active: 1954–2017
- Medium: Stand-up comedy; theatre; radio; television; music
- Genres: One-liners; music hall

Sir Kenneth Arthur Dodd (8 November 1927 – 11 March 2018) was an English comedian, actor and singer. He was described as "the last great music hall entertainer" and was primarily known for his live stand-up performances. As a singer he sold more than 100 million records.

A lifelong resident of the Knotty Ash neighbourhood of Liverpool, Dodd started his career as an entertainer in the mid-1950s. His performances included rapid and incessant delivery of often surreal jokes, and would run for several hours, frequently past midnight. His verbal and physical comedy was supplemented by his red, white, and blue "tickling stick" prop, but these colours could change for occasions such as St Patrick's Day, when he would choose a green, white and orange pair. He often introduced the sticks with his characteristic upbeat greeting of "How tickled I am!" He interspersed comedy with songs, both serious and humorous, and with his original speciality, ventriloquism. He had several hit singles, primarily as a ballad singer in the 1960s, and occasionally appeared in dramatic roles. He performed on radio and television, and popularised the characters the Diddy Men.

== Early life ==
Dodd was born on 8 November 1927 in a former farmhouse in Knotty Ash, a suburb of Liverpool, to Arthur Dodd and Sarah (née Gray). He had an elder brother, William, and a younger sister, June. He went to the Knotty Ash School, and sang in the local church choir of St John's Church, Knotty Ash. He went on to live in Knotty Ash all his life; he died in the house in which he was born, and often referred to the area—as well as its mythical "jam butty mines" and "black pudding plantations"—in his act. During the Second World War he was evacuated with his school to Shrewsbury, where he attended the Priory Grammar School for Boys. He was also evacuated to the village of Penmachno, near Betws y Coed, where he attended the local village school and learned Welsh.

He then attended Holt High School, a grammar school in Childwall, Liverpool, but left at the age of 14 to work for his father, a coal merchant. Around this time he became interested in show business after seeing an advert in a comic: "Fool your teachers, amaze your friends—send 6d in stamps and become a ventriloquist!" and sending off for the book. Not long after, his father bought him a ventriloquist's dummy and Ken called it Charlie Brown. He started entertaining at the local orphanage, then at various other local community functions. His distinctive buck teeth were the result of a cycling accident after trying to ride a bicycle with his eyes closed. Aged 18, he began working as a travelling salesman, and used his work van to travel to comedy clubs in the evenings.

== Early career ==
Before becoming a full-time professional performer, mostly on stage, his first known appearance on radio was in Variety Fanfare (producer: Ronnie Taylor, venue: Hulme Hippodrome) made by the BBC in Manchester in 1950–1952.

He said he gained his big break at the age of 26 when, in September 1954, he made his professional show-business debut as Professor Yaffle Chucklebutty, Operatic Tenor and Sausage Knotter at the Nottingham Empire. He later said, "Well at least they didn't boo me off".

He continued to tour variety theatres up and down the UK, and in 1955 he appeared at Blackpool, where, in the following year, he had a part in Let's Have Fun. His performance at the Central Pier was part of a comedy revue with Jimmy James and Company. Also on the same bill were Jimmy Clitheroe and Roy Castle. Dodd first gained top billing at Blackpool in 1958.

== Comedy ==
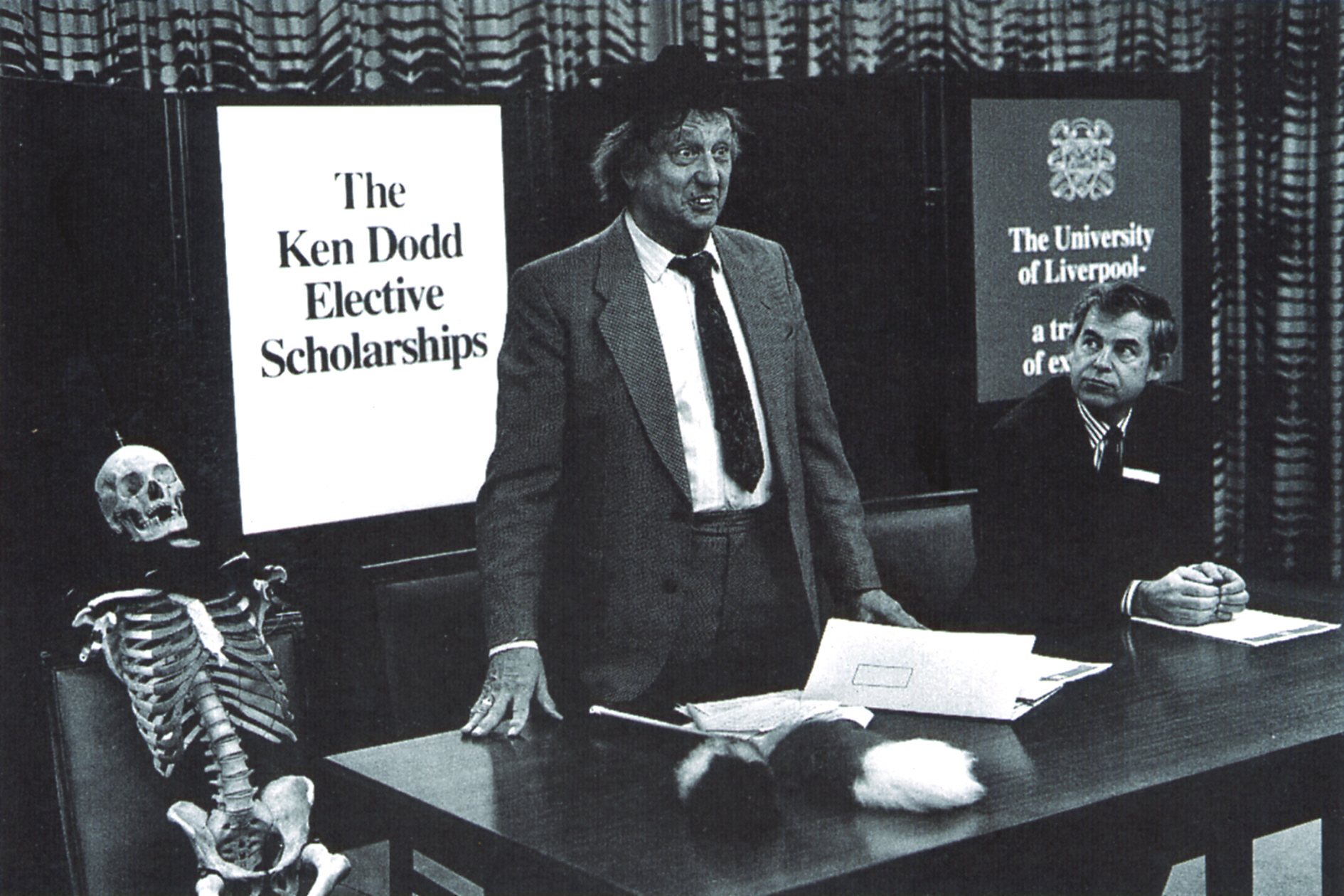
Dodd at the University of Liverpool

Dodd was described as "the last great music hall entertainer". His stand-up comedy style was fast and relied on the rapid delivery of one-liner jokes. He said that his comic influences included other Liverpool comedians like Arthur Askey, Robb Wilton, Tommy Handley and the "cheeky chappy" from Brighton, Max Miller.

In a radio interview in 2002 he recalled how he was very happy to meet Max Miller while they were performing on the same radio show recorded live at Hulme Hippodrome (probably, The Show Goes On, 1955) saying: "I once had the honour of being on the same bill, on the radio show as Max Miller, 'the' Max Miller, the man, the grand-daddy of all comedians, was on that bill and I was on with Max Miller and he was a lovely man. Very happy days, the Hulme Hippodrome."

He interspersed the comedy with occasional songs, both serious and humorous, in an incongruously fine light baritone voice, and with his original speciality, ventriloquism. Part of his stage act featured the Diddy Men ("diddy" being Scouse slang for "small"). At first an unseen joke conceived as part of Dodd's imagination, they later appeared on stage, usually played by children or puppets.

Dodd worked mainly as a solo comedian, including in a number of eponymous television and radio shows and made fifteen appearances on BBC TV's music hall revival show, The Good Old Days. Although he enjoyed making people laugh, he was also a serious student of comedy and history, and was interested in Sigmund Freud and Henri Bergson's analysis of humour. Occasionally, he appeared in dramatic roles, including Malvolio in William Shakespeare's Twelfth Night on stage in Liverpool in 1971; on television in the cameo role of 'The Tollmaster' in the 1987 Doctor Who story Delta and the Bannermen; as Yorick (in silent flashback) in Kenneth Branagh's film version of Shakespeare's Hamlet in 1996; and as Mr. Mouse in the 1999 television movie adaptation of Alice in Wonderland. Marking Dodd's ninetieth birthday, an appreciation by Guardian theatre critic Michael Billington noted that "Ken has done just about everything: annual Blackpool summer seasons, pantomimes, nationwide tours, TV and radio. He was a very fine Malvolio."

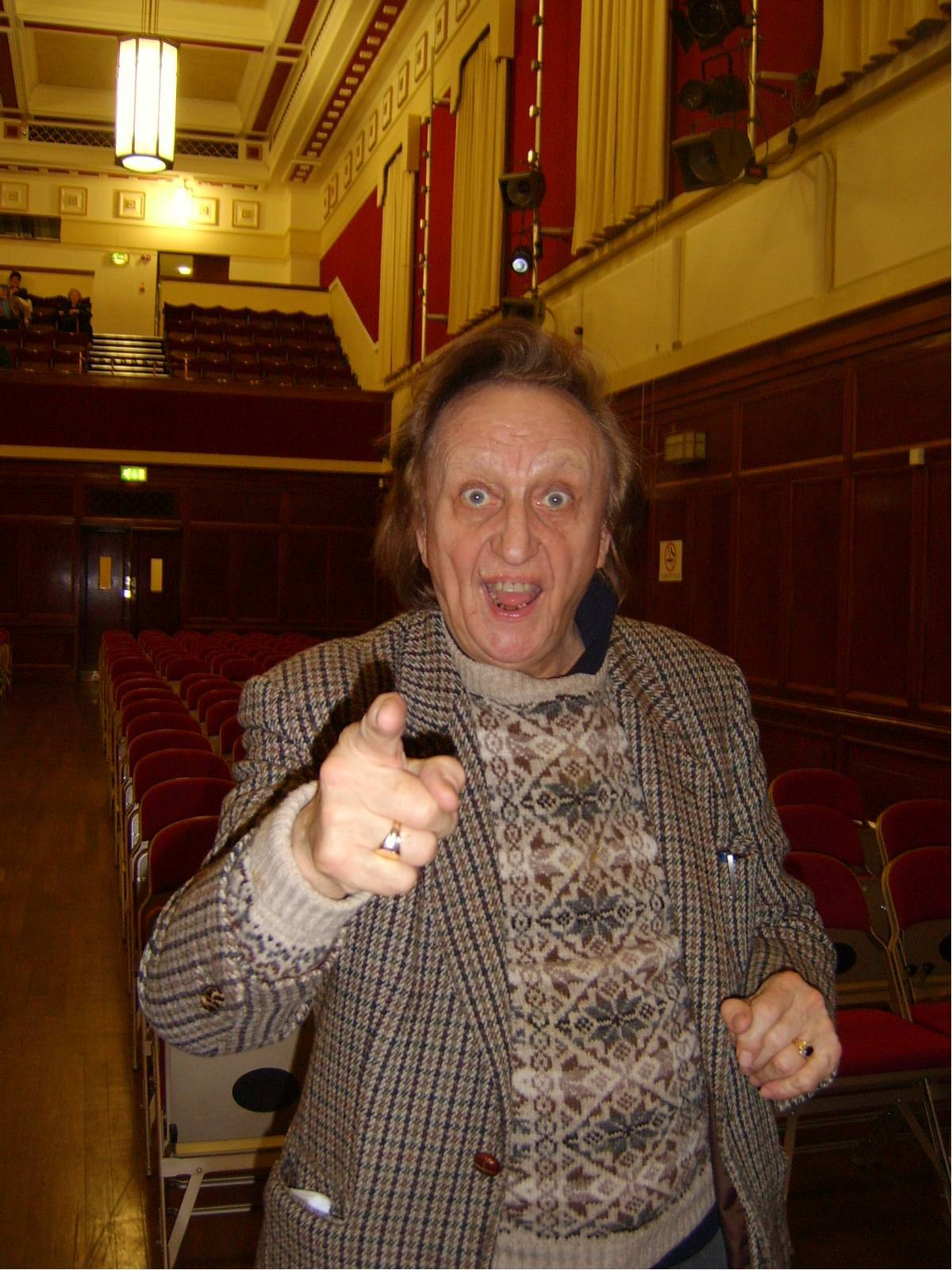
Dodd at the Civic Hall, Ellesmere Port in 2006. Stand-up theatre work was the mainstay of his career.

Dodd was renowned for the length of his performances, and during the 1960s he earned a place in The Guinness Book of Records for the world's longest ever joke-telling session: 1,500 jokes in three-and-a-half hours (7.14 jokes per minute), undertaken at the Royal Court Theatre, Liverpool, where audiences entered the show in shifts.

Dodd appeared in many Royal Variety Performances. The last was in 2006, in front of Prince Charles and his wife Camilla, at the London Coliseum.

Dodd toured frequently throughout his professional career, performing lengthy shows into his eighties, that often did not finish until after midnight. In his final year, he continued to tour the UK extensively, with his comedy, music and variety show. His final performance was on 28 December 2017 at the Echo Arena Auditorium in Liverpool. He said the secret of his success was simply, "I love what I do".

== Music ==
Dodd had many hit records, charting on 18 occasions in the UK Top 40, including his first single "Love Is Like a Violin" (1960), produced on Decca Records by Alex Wharton, which charted at number 8 (UK). His version of Bill Anderson's song "Happiness" charted in 1964 and became Dodd's signature song.

Dodd's recording of "Tears" on the Columbia label topped the UK singles chart for five weeks in 1965, becoming the biggest hit single in Britain that year and selling over a million copies in the UK alone. The recording was the third-highest selling song of the 1960s in Britain; at the time it was the UK's biggest selling single by a solo artist, and remains one of the biggest selling singles of all time. Dodd was selected to perform the song on A Jubilee of Music on BBC One on 31 December 1976, a celebration of the key pop successes of the Queen's first 25 years as Britain's monarch.

Dodd had two further UK top ten records: "The River (Le Colline Sono In Fiore)", written by Renato Angiolini with lyrics by Mort Shuman (number 3, 1965); and "Promises", written by Norman Newell and Tom Springfield (number 6, 1966). As well as his successful chart career as a ballad singer, Dodd occasionally released comedy novelty records, including the 1965 EP Doddy and the Diddy Men, featuring the song "Where's Me Shirt?" which Dodd co-wrote.

In the 1960s, his fame in the UK was such that he rivalled the Beatles as a household name, and his records have sold millions worldwide.

In 2021, Ken Dodd's recording of "Love is Like a Violin" was featured in the Walt Disney film Cruella.

== Tax evasion court case ==
In 1989, Dodd was charged with tax evasion. The ensuing trial, with the prosecution case led by Brian Leveson QC, produced several revelations. The Diddy Men, who had appeared in his stage act, were often played by local children from stage schools and were revealed never to have been paid. Dodd was also revealed to have very little money in his bank account, having £336,000 in cash (equivalent to £889,044 in 2025) stashed in suitcases in his attic. When asked by the judge, "What does £100,000 in a suitcase feel like?", Dodd famously replied, "The notes are very light, M'Lord."

He also said: "I am not mean, but I am nervous of money, nervous of having it, nervous of not having it" and described money as "important only because I have nothing else".

Dodd was represented by George Carman QC, who in court quipped, "Some accountants are comedians, but comedians are never accountants". He described Dodd as "a fantasist stamped with lifelong eccentricities." The trial lasted three weeks; Dodd was acquitted.

Despite the strain of the trial, Dodd immediately capitalised on his new-found notoriety with a successful season running from Easter to Christmas 1990 at the London Palladium. It was there he had previously broken the house record for the longest comedy season at the theatre, in 1965, with a residency lasting 42 weeks. Some of his subsequent material mocked the trial and tax in general. For a while, he introduced his act with the words, "Good evening, my name is Kenneth Arthur Dodd; singer, photographic playboy, and failed accountant!" Dodd also made a joke that when income tax was introduced it was a mere 2p in every £1 earned, followed by the punchline "I thought it still was!"

== Honours ==
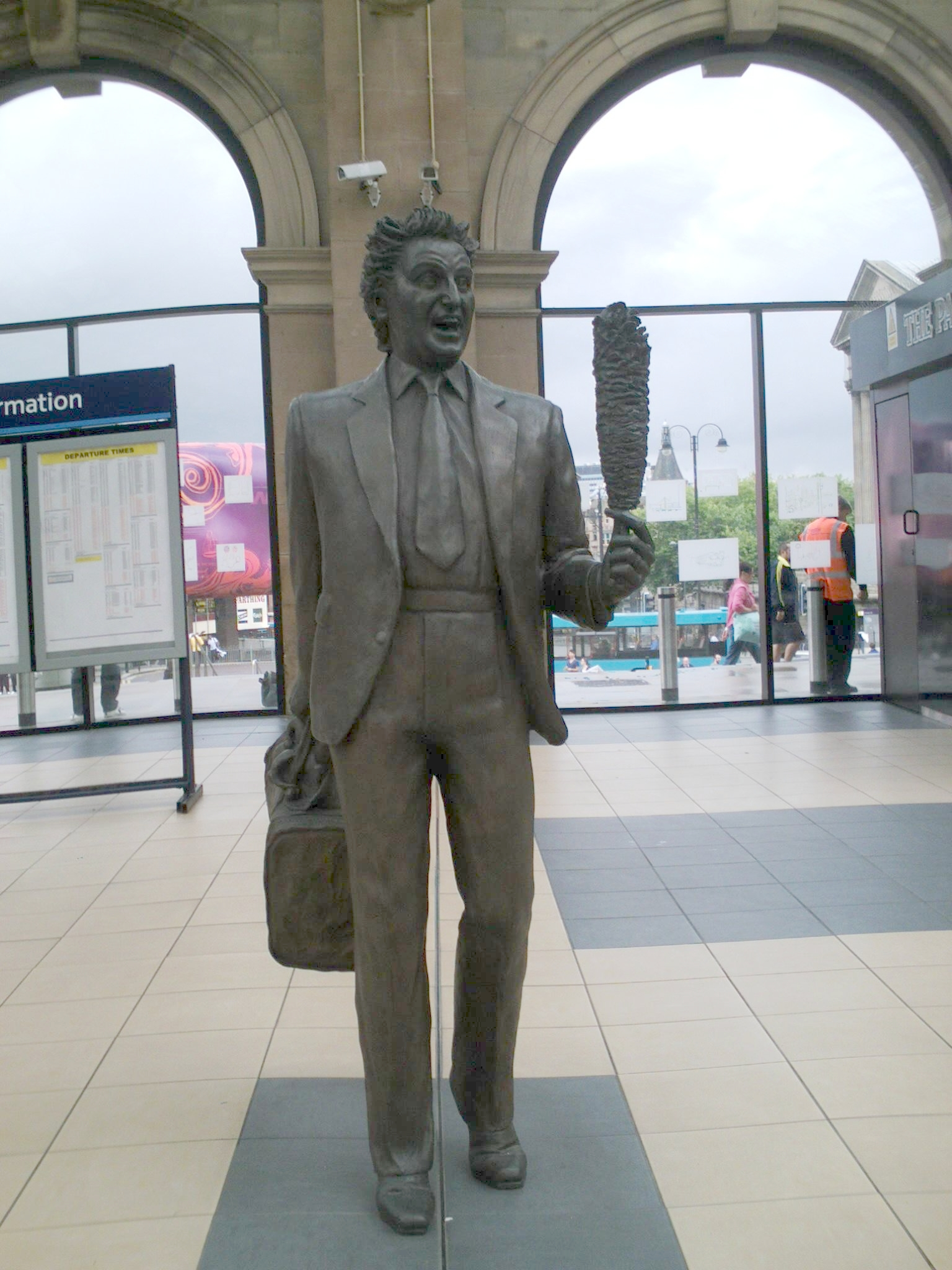
The statue of Dodd at Liverpool Lime Street railway station

He was appointed Officer of the Order of the British Empire (OBE) in the 1982 New Year Honours for services to show business and charity and was knighted in the 2017 New Year Honours for services to entertainment and charity. The award was formally conferred by Prince William, Duke of Cambridge in a ceremony at Buckingham Palace on 2 March 2017.

In 1993, Dodd won Top Variety Entertainer and was also awarded a Lifetime Achievement Award at ITV's British Comedy Awards. In 1994, Dodd appeared in the TV special An Audience with Ken Dodd. The show was a success and introduced him to a younger audience. Dodd later became one of a select few to be given a second show, entitled Another Audience with Ken Dodd and originally broadcast in 2002.

He was made a Freeman of the City of Liverpool in 2001.

In a 2005 poll of comedians and comedy insiders to find the 'Comedians' Comedian', Dodd was voted amongst the 'Top 50 Comedy Acts Ever', ranked as number 36. He was made an honorary fellow of Liverpool John Moores University in 1997. A statue depicting Dodd with his trademark "Tickling Stick" was unveiled in Liverpool Lime Street railway station in June 2009. It was temporarily removed in 2017 for renovation works.

Dodd was inducted into the exclusive show business fraternity, the Grand Order of Water Rats.

Dodd was awarded the honorary degree of Doctor of Letters from the University of Chester at a graduation ceremony in 2009 in Chester Cathedral. He was awarded a Doctorate of Letters at Liverpool Hope University in 2010 during the university's Foundation Day celebrations.

In 2016, Dodd was awarded the Aardman Slapstick Comedy Legend Award, a recognition of his lifetime's contribution to the world of comedy. He received the award as part of the Slapstick Festival in Bristol.

== Personal life ==
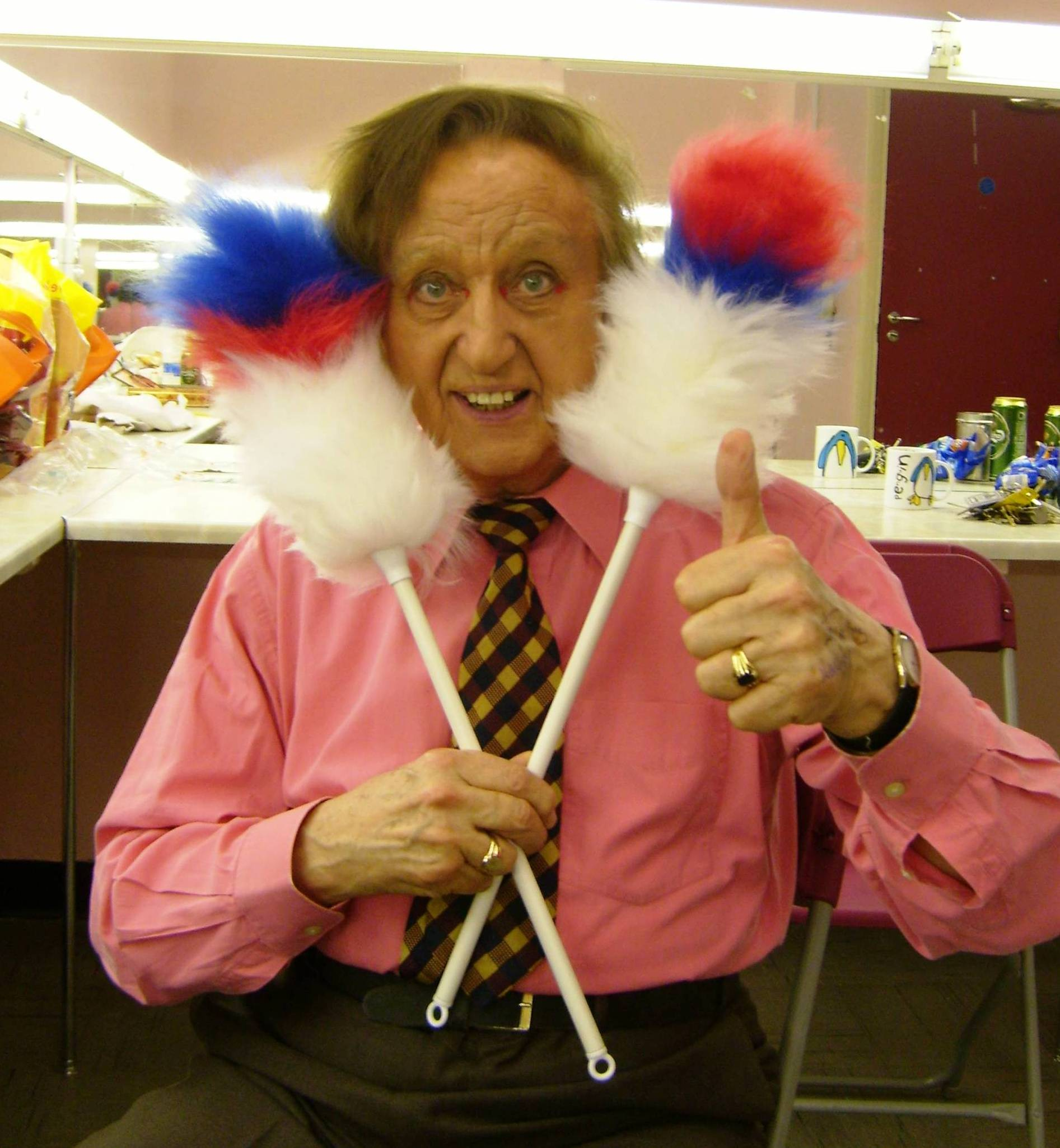
Dodd with his "tickling sticks" in 2007

Dodd's relationships with women lasted for decades; Dodd's biographer Stephen Griffin wrote: "As ever, despite the blossoming romance, there was to be no talk of marriage ... he thought that marriage could lead to complacency in a relationship, and caused some couples to stop putting in any effort." In 1955, Dodd began a 22-year relationship with Anita Boutin; they were engaged at the time of her death from a brain tumour in 1977, at the age of 45. Shortly after her death, Dodd began a relationship with Anne Jones, which lasted from 1978 until his death. They had first met in 1961 when Jones appeared in The Ken Dodd Christmas Show at the Manchester Opera House. Dodd married Jones on 9 March 2018, two days before his death.

Dodd was a supporter of the Conservative Party and campaigned for Margaret Thatcher in the 1979 general election. He introduced her onto the stage during a rally at Wembley Arena.

Dodd said that one of his biggest regrets in life was that he never had children. It was widely reported that he and Anne Jones were unable to conceive naturally. During his 1989 trial details of his personal life surfaced in the media, including revelations that he and Anne had undergone several failed rounds of IVF treatment in an attempt to start a family.

In October 2001, a stalker - Ruth Tagg - harassed Dodd and Jones by sending them threatening letters and a dead rat; also appearing on the front row at almost all of his live shows during this time. She also attempted to burn down their house by pushing burning rags through the letterbox, causing £11,000 worth of damage to the ground floor. Tagg pleaded guilty to harassment and arson at Preston Crown Court in 2003.

== Death and tributes ==
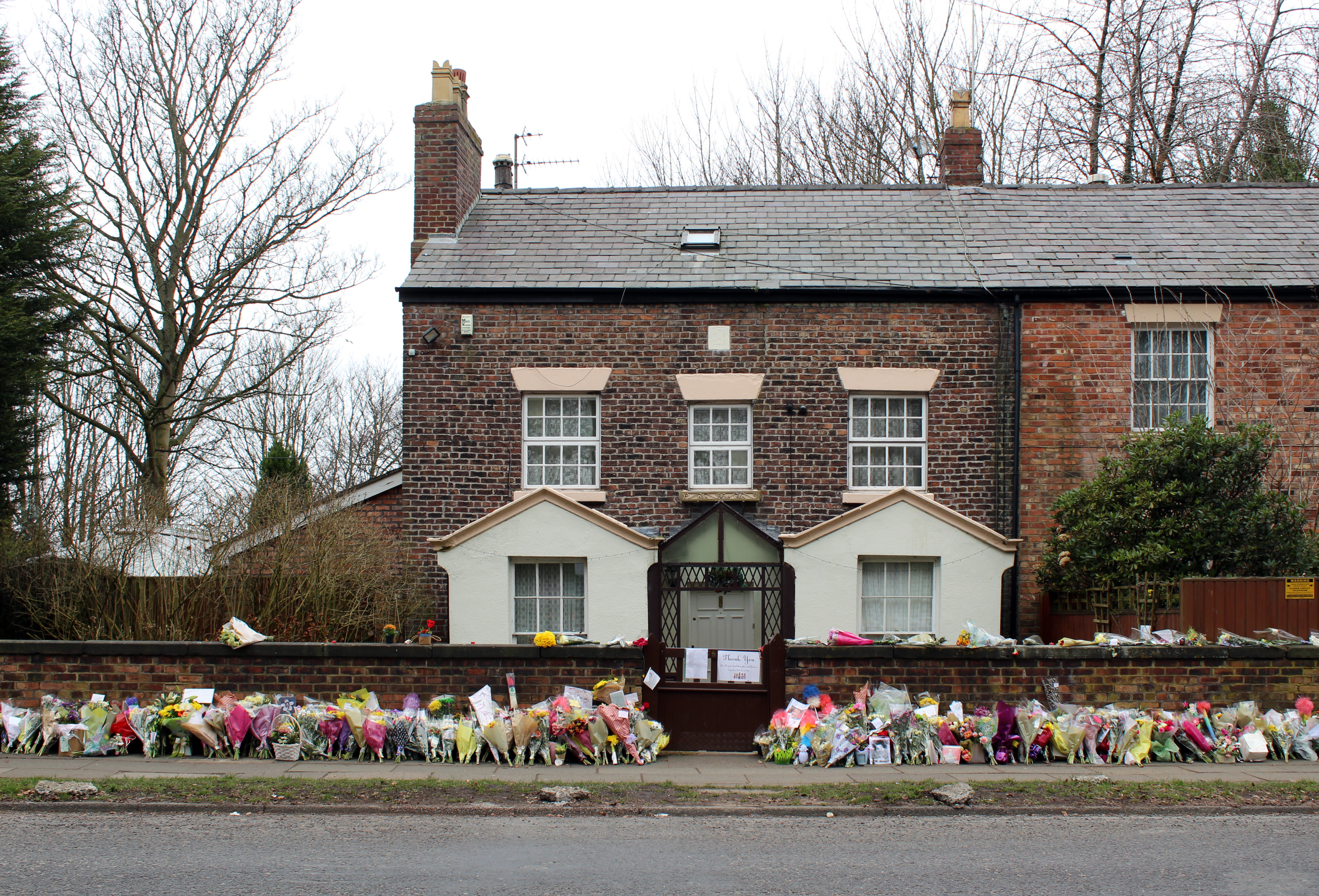
Oak House, Dodd's lifelong home, with floral tributes

Dodd died aged 90, on 11 March 2018, at his home in Knotty Ash, the same home in which he was born and raised, soon after being hospitalised for six weeks with a chest infection. He had been touring with his stand-up stage show up until the end of 2017. Numerous stars paid tribute, including fellow Liverpudlian Paul McCartney. At his funeral on 28 March, which was led by the Bishop of Liverpool, Paul Bayes, thousands of fans joined the cortege which passed from his Knotty Ash home to Liverpool Cathedral. The service was attended by actors Ricky Tomlinson, Stephanie Cole and Miriam Margolyes, comedians Jimmy Tarbuck, Stan Boardman, Roy Chubby Brown, and Jimmy Cricket, and television executive Michael Grade. After the service, Dodd was laid to rest - alongside both his parents - in a private burial service at Allerton Cemetery in Liverpool. Tickling sticks were placed on various statues around Liverpool in commemoration. At Liverpool Town Hall, St George's Hall, the Cunard Building and Liverpool Central Library, flags were lowered to pay respect.

Theatre critic Michael Coveney declared in his appreciation for The Stage: "Ken Dodd was the greatest live performer I ever saw on stage anywhere."

In the December 2018 BBC TV retrospective, How Tickled We Were, the comic's biographer Michael Billington ranked Dodd alongside Lord Olivier as one of "the two theatrical geniuses of the British stage" in the writer's own lifetime. In the same broadcast, fellow Liverpudlian and comedian Jimmy Tarbuck declared Dodd "the greatest stage comic the country has ever seen".

In October 2020, Dodd's headstone was vandalised with graffiti.

In September 2022, Anne endowed stained-glass windows at St Anne's Church, Old Swan, in memory of her husband.

== Television work ==
Ken Dodd had numerous television shows and specials over 60 years, including:

- The Ken Dodd Show BBC TV (1959–1969)
- Complete Interview with Ken Dodd & the Beatles (1963)
- Doddy's Music Box – ABC-TV (1967–1968)
- Ken Dodd and the Diddymen – BBC-TV (1969–1972)
- The Ken Dodd Show – LWT (1969)
- Ken Dodd in Funny You Should Say That – ATV (1972)
- Ken Dodd Says Stand by Your Beds
- Ken Dodd's World of Laughter – BBC-TV 3 series, 19 episodes (1974–76)
- The Ken Dodd New Year's Eve Special (1975)
- The Ken Dodd Show – Thames Television (1978)
- The Ken Dodd Laughter Show – Thames Television (1979)
- Dodd on His Todd (1981)
- Doddy! (1982)
- Ken Dodd's Showbiz – BBC-TV 6 episodes (1982)
- Ken Dodd at the London Palladium – Thames Television (1990)
- An Audience with Ken Dodd – LWT (1994)
- Another Audience with Ken Dodd – LWT (2002)
- Ken Dodd's Happiness – 'Arena' Illuminations Productions for BBC-TV (2007)
- Talking Comedy (2016)
- Ken Dodd: In His Own Words – ITN Productions for Channel 5 (2017)
- Ken Dodd How Tickled We Were – BBC-TV (documentary) (2018)

=== Other television work ===
Dodd also appeared in many other programmes, as an actor, performer, or as himself. Appearances include:

- The Good Old Days – BBC-TV (15 episodes 1955–1982)
- The Golden Shot – ATV (11 episodes 1969–74)
- Junior Showtime – Yorkshire Television (2 episodes 1970)
- Lift Off / Lift Off with Ayshea – Granada Television (6 episodes 1970, 1971, 1972, 1974)
- Whittaker's World of Music – LWT (1971)
- Look Who's Talking – Border Television (1973)
- Stars on Sunday – Yorkshire Television (7 episodes 1977–79)
- Be My Guest – Granada Television (1 episode 1977)
- The South Bank Show – LWT (1978)
- Doctor Who: Delta and the Bannermen – BBC-TV (1987)
- A Question of Entertainment – BBC-TV 18 episodes (1988)
- Hamlet (1996)
- Heroes of Comedy – Thames Television (1995–2001) About himself and other comics
- Alice in Wonderland (1999)
- Dawn French's Boys Who Do Comedy (2007)
- My Favourite Joke – 4 episodes (2011)
- The Story of Variety with Michael Grade – 2 episodes (2011)
- Fern Britton Meets... (2013)

== Radio series ==
- It's Great to be Young (1959,-1961)
- The Ken Dodd Show (1963–1973) 1972 series subtitled 'Doddy's Daft Half Hour', 1973 series subtitled 'Doddy's Comic Cuts'
- Ken Dodd (1975), sometimes referred to as 'They Can't Touch You for It' or 'Ken Dodd's World of Whimsy'
- Doddy's Different Show (1981)
- Ken Dodd's Palace of Laughter (1986–1987)
- Ken Dodd's Easter Special (4th Apr 1988)
- Ken Dodd's Christmas Cracker (25th Dec 1986, 24th Dec 1987)
- Ken Dodd: How Tickled I've Been (2007)

== Discography ==
=== Album discography ===
- Presenting Ken Dodd (Columbia, 1962)
- Doddy and the Diddy Men (Columbia, 1965)
- Tears of Happiness (Columbia, 1965)
- Tears & the River (Liberty, 1966)
- For Someone Special (Columbia, 1967)
- I Wish You Love (Columbia, 1967)
- Don't Let Tonight Ever End (Columbia, 1968)
- I'll Find a Way (Columbia, 1970)
- Brokenhearted (Columbia, 1971)
- With Love in Mind (Columbia, 1971)
- Just Out of Reach (Columbia, 1973)
- Love Together (EMI, 1976)
- Now and Forever (VIP Records, 1983)
- Ken Dodd and the Diddymen (Knotty Ash Records, 1987)

=== UK chart singles ===
Title	Release date	Chart position UK Singles	Notes
"Love Is Like a Violin"	7 July 1960	8	
"Once in Every Lifetime"	15 June 1961	28	
"Pianissimo"	1 February 1962	21	
"Still"	29 August 1963	35	
"Eight by Ten"	6 February 1964	22	
"Happiness"	23 July 1964	31	
"So Deep Is the Night"	26 November 1964	31	
"Tears"	2 September 1965	1	Sold over 1.5 million copies; 39th best-selling single of all time in the UK
"The River (Le colline sono in fiore)"	18 November 1965	3	with Geoff Love and his Orchestra
"Promises"	12 May 1966	6	
"More Than Love"	4 August 1966	14	
"It's Love"	27 October 1966	36	
"Let Me Cry on Your Shoulder"	19 January 1967	11	
"Tears Won't Wash Away These Heartaches"	30 July 1969	22	
"Brokenhearted"	5 December 1970	15	
"When Love Comes Round Again (L'arca di Noè)"	10 July 1971	19	
"Just Out of Reach (Of My Two Empty Arms)"	18 November 1972	29	
"Think of Me (Wherever You Are)"	29 November 1975	21	
"Hold My Hand"	26 December 1981	44	
