= Happy! =

Happy! may refer to:

- Happy!, an American comic book series by Grant Morrison
  - Happy! (TV series), an American television series based on the comic book series
- Happy! (manga), a Japanese manga series by Naoki Urasawa

== See also ==
- Happy (disambiguation)
