= Watterson Hall =

Studio album by William Clark Green
- Released: March 6, 2026
- Recorded: 2025–2026
- Studio: Southern Ground Studios
- Genres: Texas country, red dirt
- Length: 50:02
- Label: Bill Grease Records

William Clark Green chronology
Baker Hotel (2022)	Watterson Hall (2026)

Watterson Hall is the seventh studio album by American musician William Clark Green. It was released on Bill Grease Records on March 6, 2026. It is the follow-up to his 2022 album, Baker Hotel. The album blends Texas country and red dirt with autobiographical songwriting, exploring themes of family, love, and life experience.

The album was inspired by the dance hall of the same name in Red Rock, Texas and by Green's family life, with the artist stating that it "is all about meeting my wife and starting a family."

== Recording ==
Watterson Hall was recorded at Southern Ground Studios in Nashville, Tennessee, with producer Logan Wall. After the release of his previous album, Green focused on writing songs influenced by his personal life, including his marriage and fatherhood. The album was mastered by Pete Lyman at Infrasonic Sound in Nashville, Tennessee.

== Release ==
The lead single, "Man on the Moon", was released ahead of the album. Other singles released were "Watterson Hall (Me & You)", "Whole Lotta Lubbock", and "Where the Wild Things Are". An official video for "Watterson Hall (Me & You)" was released on January 9, 2026. Green promoted the album through interviews, social media, and a supporting tour across Texas and surrounding regions.

== Reception ==
In a review for PopMatters, the album was noted for its strong ties to Texas culture, with songs such as "Whole Lotta Lubbock" and "Cowtown" highlighting local imagery and themes. The review also emphasized the album's focus on family life and personal values, describing it as reflective of a traditional Texas country identity. In a review for Glide Magazine, Jim Hynes described the album as reflecting a more mature perspective, with themes of marriage, fatherhood, and personal loss taking precedence over Green's earlier material. Writing for No Depression, John Amen commented that Green "acknowledges the inevitability of hardships while insisting that life is a gift we should never take for granted". He added that Clark's "songwriting skills and talent for delivering an engaging hook are on full display".

Billboard noted that the album reflects a shift away from Green's earlier themes of heartbreak toward songs inspired by his marriage and family life.

== Track listing ==
No.	Title	Length
1	Stubborn and Remains	3:21
2	Watterson Hall (Me & You)	3:41
3	Whole Lotta Lubbock	3:12
4	Where the Wild Things Are	4:30
5	Dear Life	3:08
6	Something You Would Die For	3:48
7	Good Time	3:46
8	I Am the Kite	2:56
9	Cowtown	2:36
10	Hawks Don't Fly With Chickens	3:44
11	Fight to Love Another Day	3:46
12	Let You Go	4:40
13	Man on the Moon	3:07
14	Drinkin' and Drivin'	3:47
Total		50:02

== Personnel ==
=== Musicians ===
- William Clark Green – vocals, acoustic guitar
- Bryan Sutton – acoustic guitar (all tracks)
- Rob McNelley – electric guitar (all tracks)
- Charlie Worsham – acoustic guitar (tracks 3–4)
- Lex Price – bass (tracks 1, 6, 8, 12, 14)
- Sam Hunter – bass (tracks 3, 4, 7, 9–11, 13)
- Chris Powell – drums, percussion (tracks 1–12, 14)
- Evan Hutchings – drums, percussion (tracks 3–4)
- Billy & Bill Justineau – keys (Billy: all tracks; Bill: 3–4)
- Eddy Dunlap – steel guitar (tracks 2, 3, 5)
- Billy McClaren – fiddle (tracks 2, 3, 5, 7, 9)
- Gideon Klein – cello, viola, violin, steel guitar (track 8)
- Background vocals – Travis Meadows (8), Logan Wall (1–3, 6–14), Sean McConnell (12)
- Gang vocals – Jack Rauton, Jack Hummel (track 14)

=== Songwriters ===
- William Clark Green – all tracks
- Logan Wall – tracks 1, 6, 8, 9
- Travis Meadows – tracks 1, 8
- Benjy Davis – track 2
- Ryan Beaver – track 2
- Gary Stanton – track 3
- Bill Satcher – track 4
- Michael Hobby – track 4
- Max Martin – track 5
- Chase McDaniel – track 5
- Rob Ragosta – track 7
- Joe Ragosta – track 7
- Nick Columbia – tracks 7, 11
- Keller Cox – track 9
- Rob Snyder – track 10
- Daniel Ethridge – track 11
- Sean McConnell – track 12
- Justin Glasco – track 13
- Sean Van Vleet – track 13
- Joe Walker – track 13
- Jack Rauton – track 14
- Jack Hummel – track 14

=== Technical personnel ===
- Logan Wall – producer, mixing, additional recording
- Chris Small – digital editing
- Pete Lyman – mastering (Infrasonic Sound, Nashville)
- Josh Ditty – recording (Southern Ground Studios, Nashville)
- Drew Bollman – recording (tracks 3, 4; Sound Emporium, Nashville)
- Dan Davis, Grant Wilson – recording assistants
- Jason Hall – mixing (track 3)
- Chris Henderson – mastering (track 3)
- Scott Johnson – production management
- A&R – David Bason, Ellie Tomasso, Zach Fischel
