= Hapi =

Hapi can refer to:

- Hapi (Nile god), an Egyptian river god
- Hapi (Son of Horus), an Egyptian funerary deity
- Hapi, Iran, a village in East Azerbaijan Province
- Hapi, a beer brand owned by Harbin Brewery
- Prince Hapi, a character in Around the World in 80 Days (2004 film) played by Arnold Schwarzenegger
- Helicopter Approach Path Indicator (HAPI), a type of aircraft Visual Glide Slope Indicator
- Healthy Americans Private Insurance Plans (HAPIs), which would have been established by the Healthy Americans Act, a failed Senate bill
- hapi (hapi.js), a web application server framework for Node.js
- "Hapi", a song by Benji and EarthGang from Spilligion
- Another name for the Xiapei

== See also ==
- Apis (deity), also spelled Hapis, an Egyptian god worshipped in Memphis
- Happi, a traditional Japanese coat
- Happi (film), a 2019 Bollywood film
- Happy (disambiguation)
