= Flint, Texas =

Flint
- Unincorporated community
- Location within the state of Texas Flint (the United States)
- Coordinates: 32°12′15″N 95°20′55″W
- Country: United States
- State: Texas
- County: Smith
- Elevation: 522 ft (159 m)
- Time zone: UTC-6 (Central (CST))
  - Summer (DST): UTC-5 (CDT)
- ZIP codes: 75762
- Area codes: 903, 430
- GNIS feature ID: 1335957

Flint is an unincorporated community in southeastern Smith County, Texas, United States. It lies along FM 2493, south of the city of Tyler, the county seat of Smith County. Its elevation is 522 feet (159 m). Although Flint is unincorporated, it has a post office, with the ZIP code of 75762.

== History ==
The town started out as a stop/station on a railroad and was named for Robert P. Flynt, a local landowner. However, in 1887, as the post office was starting operations, and the postmaster, Charles B. Brown, misspelled the name on application forms (as "Flint"), it became known by the current spelling instead.

== Climate ==
Flint is considered to be part of the humid subtropical region.

== Notable person ==
- William Clark Green, Country singer and guitarist
