= Happiness (disambiguation) =

Happiness is an emotional state characterized by feelings of enjoyment, pleasure, and satisfaction.

Happiness may also refer to:

== Film ==
- Happiness (1917 film), an American silent film directed by Reginald Barker
- Happiness (1924 film), an American silent film directed by King Vidor
- Le Bonheur (1934 film) or Happiness, a French film directed by Marcel L'Herbier
- Happiness (1935 film), a Soviet silent film directed by Aleksandr Medvedkin
- Happiness (1957 film), a Mexican film directed by Alfonso Corona Blake
- Happiness (1965 film) or Le Bonheur, a French film directed by Agnès Varda
- Happiness (1998 film), an American film directed by Todd Solondz
- Happiness (2007 film), a South Korean film directed by Hur Jin-ho
- Happiness (2013 film), a French-Finnish documentary by Thomas Balmès
- Happiness (2016 film), a Hong Kong film directed by Andy Lo
- Happiness, a 2017 animated short film by Steve Cutts
- Happiness, a Japanese film directed by Tetsuo Shinohara

== Television ==
- Happiness (British TV series), a 2000s British sitcom
- Happiness (South Korean TV series), a 2021 television series
- Happiness (New Zealand TV series), a 2025 television series
- "Happiness", a Series H episode of the television series QI (2010)
- Happiness (telenovela), a Brazilian telenovela

== Literature ==
- Happiness (manga), a manga series by Shūzō Oshimi
- Happiness (play), a 2013 play by David Williamson
- "Happiness" (short story), an 1887 story by Anton Chekhov
- Happiness, a 2006 novel by Novala Takemoto
- Happiness, a 2006 book by Matthieu Ricard
- Happiness, reissue title of Generica, a 2001 novel by Will Ferguson
- Happiness: A History, a 2006 non-fiction book by Darrin M. McMahon
- "Happiness", a poem by A. A. Milne from his 1924 book When We Were Very Young

== Music ==
=== Groups ===
- Happiness (group), a Japanese pop girl group
- Happyness (band), an English alternative rock band

=== Albums ===
- Happiness (The Beloved album), 1990
- Happiness (Dance Gavin Dance album) or the title song, 2009
- Happiness (Fridge album), 2001
- Happiness (Hurts album) or the title song, 2010
- Happiness (Kid606 album), 2013
- Happiness (Lisa Germano album) or the title song, 1993
- Happiness (Maki Ohguro album) or the title song, 2005
- Happiness (Matthew Ryan album), 2002
- Happiness (Margo Smith album), 1977
- Happiness? (Roger Taylor album) or the title song, 1994
- Happiness (The Weepies album) or the title song, 2003
- Happiness (Kōfuku Kangei!) or the title song, by Berryz Kobo, 2004
- Happiness (EP) or the title song, by Tom Hingley, 2002
- Happiness: The Best of Michael Rose or the 1997 title song (see below), by Michael Rose, 2004
- Happiness... Is Not a Fish That You Can Catch, by Our Lady Peace, 1999
- Happiness, by The Russian Jazz Quartet, 1965

=== Songs ===
- "Happiness" (The 1975 song), 2022
- "Happiness" (Ai song), 2011
- "Happiness" (Alexis Jordan song), 2010
- "Happiness" (Arashi song), 2007
- "Happiness" (Bill Anderson song), 1963; covered by Ken Dodd, 1964
- "Happiness" (The Blue Nile song), 1996
- "Happiness" (Elliott Smith song), 2000
- "Happiness" (Goldfrapp song), 2008
- "Happiness!!!" (Kaela Kimura song), 2004
- "Happiness" (Pizzaman song), 1995
- "Happiness" (Pointer Sisters song), 1979
- "Happiness" (Red Velvet song), 2014
- "Happiness" (Robert Palmer song), 1991
- "Happiness" (Sam Sparro song), 2012
- "Happiness" (Taylor Swift song), 2020
- "Happiness" (Vanessa Williams song), 1997
- "Happiness (Rotting My Brain)", by Regurgitator, 1999
- "Happiness", by Adam Cohen and Virginie Ledoyen, 2004
- "Happiness", by Benjamin Ingrosso from Identification, 2018
- "Happiness", by Black Uhuru from Sinsemilla, 1980
- "Happiness", by Built to Spill from Ancient Melodies of the Future, 2001
- "Happiness", by Collective Soul from Blender, 2000
- "Happiness", by Eytan Mirsky from the film Happiness, 1998
- "Happiness", by the Fray from The Fray, 2009
- "Happiness", by iamnot from Hope, 2017
- "Happiness", by Kasabian from West Ryder Pauper Lunatic Asylum, 2009
- "Happiness", by Lee Ann Womack from There's More Where That Came From, 2005
- "Happiness", by Little Mix from Confetti, 2020
- "Happiness", by the Mavis's from Rapture, 2003
- "Happiness", by Michael Rose from Dance Wicked, 1997
- "Happiness", by Natalie Bassingthwaighte, a B-side of the single "1000 Stars", 2009
- "Happiness", by Needtobreathe from Hard Love, 2016
- "Happiness", by Orson from Bright Idea, 2006
- "Happiness", by Pet Shop Boys from Super, 2016
- "Happiness", by Platinum Weird from Make Believe, 2006
- "Happiness", by Susumu Hirasawa from Paranoia Agent Original Soundtrack, 2004
- "Happiness", by Three Days Grace from Transit of Venus, 2012
- "Happiness", by Wilco from Schmilco, 2016
- "Happiness", by Will Young from Keep On, 2005
- "Happiness", from the musical Passion, 1994
- "Happiness", from the musical You're a Good Man, Charlie Brown, 1967
- "Prelude: Happiness", by Deep Purple from Shades of Deep Purple, 1968

== Other uses ==
- Happiness! (visual novel), a Japanese video game and anime

== See also ==
- Happy (disambiguation)
- Le bonheur (disambiguation)
- My Happiness (disambiguation)
- Utility, in economics, a concept sometimes correlated with happiness
