= Bonheur =

Bonheur may refer to:

== People ==
- Auguste Bonheur, French painter
- Isidore Bonheur, French animalier sculptor
- Juliette Bonheur, French painter
- Lucien Bonheur, French Progressive
- Rosa Bonheur, French artist

== Other ==
- Bonheur (company), Norwegian company

== See also ==
- Le Bonheur (disambiguation)
