= Bad State of Mind =

2025 single by Treaty Oak Revival

Single by Treaty Oak Revival

from the album West Texas Degenerate
- Released: February 14, 2025
- Genre: Country rock; midwest emo
- Length: 4:21
- Label: Self-released
- Songwriters: Andrew Carey; Blake Stiles; Cody Holloway; Jeremiah Vanley; Lance Vanley; Sam Canty
- Producers: Carey; Holloway; J. Vanley; L. Vanley; Canty

Treaty Oak Revival singles chronology
"Happy Face" (2024)	"Bad State of Mind" (2025)

"Bad State of Mind" is a song by American southern rock and country rock band Treaty Oak Revival, released on February 14, 2025, as the second single from their third studio album, West Texas Degenerate (2025).

== Background ==
Treaty Oak Revival described the song as "our gift to those who might be having a bad time on Valentine's Day."

== Composition ==
"Bad State of Mind" is a country rock and midwest emo song. Over layers of guitar, Sam Canty delivers emotional lyrics as he addresses his negative, intrusive thoughts and frustration with circumstances beyond his control, while hoping to move past this state soon.

== Live performances ==
Treaty Oak Revival performed the song on Jimmy Kimmel Live! on April 21, 2025.

== Charts ==
=== Weekly charts ===
Weekly chart performance
Chart (2025)	Peak position
Canada (Canadian Hot 100)	96
US Bubbling Under Hot 100 (Billboard)	1
US Hot Country Songs (Billboard)	19
US Hot Rock & Alternative Songs (Billboard)	10

=== Year-end charts ===
Year-end chart performance
Chart (2025)	Position
US Hot Rock & Alternative Songs (Billboard)	40

== Certifications ==
Region	Certification	Certified units/sales
United States (RIAA)	Platinum	1,000,000^{‡}
^{‡} Sales+streaming figures based on certification alone.
