= William Clark Green =

American singer-songwriter (born 1986)

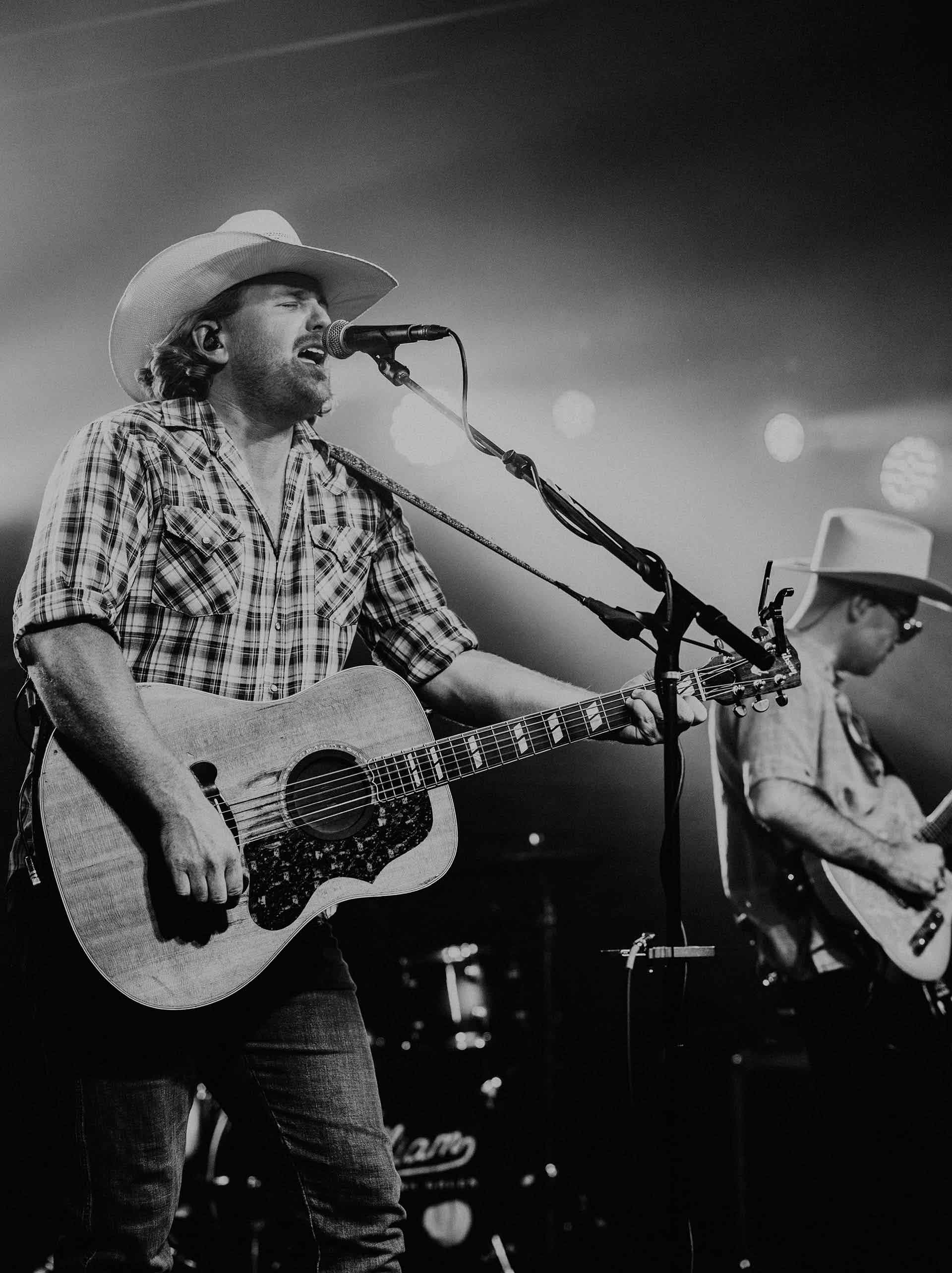
- William Clark Green at Scoot Inn in Austin TX, in September 2025

Background information
- Born: William Clark Green; May 19, 1986 (age 40)
- Origin: Flint, Texas, U.S.
- Genre: Country
- Occupations: Singer, songwriter
- Years active: 2008-present
- Label: Bill Grease Records LLC
- Website: http://www.williamclarkgreen.com/

William Clark Green (born May 19, 1986) is an American country music singer and songwriter from Flint, Texas. He has released seven studio albums and two live albums.

== Early life ==
Green is from Flint, Texas. He attended A&M Consolidated High School in College Station, Texas, graduating in 2004 before he went to Texas Tech University in Lubbock, Texas. It took six years for him to graduate with an Agriculture Economics degree as he concentrated on his music career.

== Career ==
Green recorded his debut album in 2008 while attending Texas Tech in Lubbock. On September 24, 2008, the album Dangerous Man was released. In 2010, he released Misunderstood, his second album, as a follow-up.

=== 2013: Rose Queen ===
Green recorded his third album, Rose Queen, at Sixteen Ton Studio in Nashville, Tennessee in 2012, and the album was released on April 30, 2013. This became his breakthrough album. The first single from the album was "It’s About Time," which was his first Top Ten song on Texas Radio. He had a No. 1 regional hit with the song "She Likes the Beatles," and the album yielded three top ten singles on the Texas country charts. According to Green, the album was inspired by the town of Tyler, Texas which has long celebrated the Texas Rose Festival.

=== 2015: Ringling Road ===
On April 21, 2015, Green released his fourth album, Ringling Road. The album debuted on Billboard 200 at No. 133 and the Top Country Albums chart at No. 18. The first single from the album was "Sympathy" which topped the Texas Music Chart. The second single was "Sticks and Stones". According to Green, the album was inspired by the town of Eastland, Texas.

Green contributed a song to Dreamer: A Tribute to Kent Finlay, an album released in early 2016 on Austin-based Eight 30 Records. The song, titled "Still Think About You" was a co-write with Finlay, the Cheatham Street Warehouse founder who died in 2015.

A live album, Live At Gruene Hall, was released on September 23, 2016.

=== 2018–2023: Hebert Island and Baker Hotel ===
A fifth album, Hebert Island, was released on August 10, 2018.

In 2018, Green launched the music festival Cotton Fest in Lubbock, Texas, which aims to raise money for the High Cotton Relief Fund, a charitable organization supporting West Texas farm families during times of need. It has become an annual event and has raised over $2 million.

In November 2019, he released his second live album, Live At Cheatham Street Warehouse, recorded at the iconic Cheatham Street venue in San Marcos, Texas.

In 2019, Green co-founded the Texas country supergroup The Panhandlers, alongside Josh Abbott, Cleto Cordero (of Flatland Cavalry), and John Baumann. The band was formed as a tribute to a 1970's West Texas country band The Flatlanders. The Panhandlers released their first single, "No Handle" in January 2020. A few months later, the group released their self-titled debut album.

In 2022, Green released his sixth studio album, Baker Hotel. In 2023, he released Live at Baker Hotel, a live album recorded at the Baker Hotel.

=== 2024–present: Watterson Hall ===
In 2024, Green joined Shane Smith and The Saints on a tour.

Green released the lead single "Whole Lotta Lubbock" from his seventh album Watterson Hall in August 2024. The song gained popularity among Texas Tech fans, was played at home football games, and Green performed it live at a Texas Tech football game that year.

In 2025, Green became an official spokesperson for Rudy’s Bar-B-Q, a popular Texas-based barbecue chain. That year, a tenth-anniversary vinyl reissue of his 2015 album Ringling Road was released, which included the bonus track "Creek Don’t Rise". That year, Green also released the singles “Drinkin’ and Drivin’,” “Where the Wild Things Are,” and “Watterson Hall (Me & You).”

In March 2026, Green released his seventh studio album, Watterson Hall. That same year, he co-wrote and was featured on Treaty Oak Revival's "West Texas Degenerate," the title track of the band's album of the same name, and he joined the band as direct support for much of their year-long arena tour.

== Personal life ==
Green is married with three children and currently lives in Eastland, Texas.

== Discography ==
=== Studio albums ===
Title	Album details	Peak chart positions			
Title	Album details	US Country	US	US Heat	US Indie
Dangerous Man	Release date: September 24, 2008; Label: William Clark Green; Formats: CD, music download	—	—	—	—
Misunderstood	Release date: March 5, 2010; Label: William Clark Green; Formats: CD, music download	—	—	—	—
Rose Queen	Release date: April 30, 2013; Label: Bill Grease Records; Formats: CD, music download	34	—	6	41
Ringling Road	Release date: April 21, 2015; Label: Bill Grease Records; Formats: CD, music download	18	133	1	12
Hebert Island	Release date: August 10, 2018; Label: Bill Grease Records; Formats: CD, music download, stream	—	—	6	11
Baker Hotel	Release date: March 25, 2022; Label: Bill Grease Records; Formats: music download, stream	—	—	—	—
Watterson Hall	Release date: March 6, 2026; Label: Bill Grease Records; Formats: digital download, streaming	—	—	—	—
"—" denotes releases that did not chart

=== Live albums ===
Title	Album details	Peak chart positions	
Title	Album details	US Country	US Heat
Live At Gruene Hall	Release date: September 23, 2016; Label: Bill Grease Records LLC; Formats: Music download	31	24
Live At Cheatham Street Warehouse	Release date: November 8, 2019; Label: William Clark Green; Formats: Music download		
