= Bubbling Under Hot 100 =

Billboard top songs chart

Bubbling Under Hot 100 Singles (also known as Bubbling Under the Hot 100) is a chart published weekly by Billboard magazine in the United States. The chart lists the top songs that have not yet charted on the main Billboard Hot 100. Chart rankings are based on radio airplay, sales, and streams.

In its initial years, the chart listed 15 positions, but expanded to as many as 36 during the 1960s, particularly during years when over 700 singles made the Billboard Hot 100 chart. From 1974 to 1985, the chart consisted of 10 positions, and during 1985–1992 the chart was defunct. Since its revival in 1992, the Bubbling Under Hot 100 Singles chart has listed 25 positions.

== Chart history ==
The Bubbling Under Hot 100 Singles chart was introduced in the June 1, 1959, issue of Billboard, under the name "Bubbling Under the Hot 100". Containing a listing of 15 singles, the chart was described as "the new listing that predicts which new records will become chart climbers." Its first number-one single was "A Prayer and a Juke Box" by Little Anthony and the Imperials (the song would later peak at number 81). It would continue to be published in issues of Billboard until August 24, 1985, after which it was discontinued. Prior to its discontinuation, the chart had not been issued in four issues; three from 1974 and one in 1978. However, it returned as a feature in the December 5, 1992, issue of Billboard along with a new Bubbling Under Hot R&B Singles chart, and continues to the present day. From the end of 1970 to 1985, there was a Bubbling Under the Top LPs album chart paired with the Bubbling Under the Hot 100 listing.

== Compilation methods and listing ==
From June 1959 through August 1985, Billboard compiled the chart based on playlists reported by radio station and retail sales outlets surveys. In 1992, Billboard employed updated data capture technology in compiling the chart that was used for the Hot 100, using point-of-sale retail information provided by Nielsen SoundScan, input from radio station airplay monitoring provided by Broadcast Data Systems and playlists from small-market systems.

The chart's first issue mentions that a rank position indicates "relative potential to earn an early listing on the Hot 100" and records were ranked starting with number 1. From August 28, 1961, to August 24, 1985, the chart positions were numbered starting with number 101. Songs that had already appeared on the Hot 100 were not included in the Bubbling Under chart as they exit the charts, but were allowed to re-enter the Bubbling Under chart at a later date.

=== Changes and alterations ===
Over the years, the chart would undergo several changes and alterations. In the 1960s, the chart included as many as 35 slots; on two rare occasions in 1963 and 1968, the chart contained 36 slots. By the 1980s, the chart contained only 10 slots. On the first issue of its 1992 revival, the chart was renamed "Bubbling Under Hot 100 Singles", a change from its previous name, "Bubbling Under the Hot 100". The same issue increased the total number of slots on the chart to 25 and the chart numbering began with the number 1.

== Publications ==
Several reference books on the history of the Billboard "Bubbling Under" charts have been published by chart statistician Joel Whitburn's company Record Research. The latest book to be published by the company was 2005's Bubbling Under the Billboard Hot 100: 1959–2004 (ISBN 978-0-89820-162-8). Whitburn's book Top Pop Singles, 12th Edition (ISBN 978-0-89820-180-2), covers all Billboard Hot 100 and Bubbling Under Hot 100 Singles chart entries from 1955 to 2008.

== Chart milestones ==
=== Most weeks on the chart ===
Songs which have spent the most number of weeks on the Bubbling Under Hot 100 chart (at least 32 weeks charting)
Weeks	Song	Artist	Year(s)	Ref
62	"Carry You Home"	Alex Warren	2024–2026	
61	"Alive"	Pearl Jam	1998–1999	
52	"Even Flow"	Pearl Jam	1997–1998	
49	"Freestyle" (Note: This song would go on to chart on the Hot 100 proper.)	Lil Baby	2018–2019	
48	"Cinema"	Benny Benassi featuring Gary Go	2011–2012	
47	"From the Start"	Laufey	2023–2026	
44	"Praise"	Elevation Worship featuring Brandon Lake, Chris Brown & Chandler Moore	2024–2026	
43	"Think About You"	Luther Vandross	2003–2004	
43	"We Are the People"	Empire of the Sun	2025–2026	
41	"Demons"	Josiah Queen	2026	
40	"Revival"	Zach Bryan	2023–2024	
37	"Savior"	Rise Against	2010	
36	"Mountain Sound"	Of Monsters and Men	2012–2013	
35	"How Do I Say Goodbye"	Dean Lewis	2022–2023	
35	"God I'm Just Grateful"	Elevation Worship & Chandler Moore	2026	
34	"Dangerous"	Big Data featuring Joywave	2014–2015	
34	"Roommates"	Malcolm Todd	2026	
33	"Corazón Sin Cara"	Prince Royce	2010–2011	
32	"First"	Cold War Kids	2015–2016	
32	"Bellyache"	Billie Eilish	2018–2019	
32	"What He'll Never Have"	Dylan Scott	2024–2026	

=== Additional milestones ===
- Released in 1982, "Nasty Girl" by Vanity 6 spent a record-tying seven weeks at number 101, but never cracked the Billboard Hot 100.
- American rapper YoungBoy Never Broke Again holds the record for having the most "bubblers" of any artist, charting 118 (13 of them reaching number one) of them from 2017 to 2026. Before the addition of streaming services to Billboard charts in the 2010s, the record was formerly held by American soul singer Ray Charles, charting 15 from 1963 to 2005. Tina Turner appears as an artist on 16 bubblers, 13 as one-half of Ike & Tina Turner, and three as a solo artist. Similarly, Joel Whitburn also gives credit for 15 bubblers to George Clinton's Parliament/Funkadelic aggregation, which issued records under a variety of band names or solo identities. On the Bubbling Under charts, the loose-knit group appeared three times as Parliament, once as The Parliaments, three times as Funkadelic, once as The Brides of Funkenstein, twice as Bootsy's Rubber Band, once under the name of William "Bootsy" Collins, and four times under George Clinton's name. It could be argued that at least some of these groups are actually separate (though related) artists, however Whitburn lists them as one act under multiple aliases.
- Treaty Oak Revival hold the record for the act with the most appearances on the Bubbling Under chart without having any of their songs cross over into the Hot 100. Between 2024 and 2026, eight of the group's songs appeared on the bubbling under charts. Their best showing was 2025's "Bad State of Mind", which peaked at number one. The Robbs come in second place with 6. Slipknot comes in third place with five.
- During the 1960s, there were as many as 35 slots in the Bubbling Under chart (with two exceptions; see below). Forty-three different songs grabbed the very bottom rung by peaking at number 135, including tunes from Donovan ("Summer Day Reflection Song"), Doris Day ("Send Me No Flowers"), the Applejacks ("Tell Me When", a Top 10 UK hit) and two from Sammy Davis Jr. ("Bee-Bom" and "If I Ruled The World"). The Nightcrawlers cult classic "The Little Black Egg" peaked at number 135 in 1965, but was re-released and cracked the Hot 100 (at number 85) two years later. Shirley Ellis also hit number 135 with "Ever See A Diver Kiss His Wife While The Bubbles Bounce About Above The Water?", the longest-titled song ever to "bubble under". ("Coal Man", by Sir Mack Rice, is the only song to spend two weeks at number 135, and peak there, in 1969.)
- The chart contained 36 positions on two occasions. The two records that appeared at number 136 were "The Bounce" by the Olympics (April 6, 1963; the song eventually hit number 40) and "Turn Around, Look at Me" by the Vogues (May 25, 1968; a huge hit that peaked at number 7).
- One of the most mysterious records ever to appear in any Billboard chart was "Ready 'n' Steady", listed as recorded by an artist named "D. A.", which spent three weeks on the Bubbling Under chart in June 1979. In a 1995 interview, chart statistician Joel Whitburn stated that "Ready 'n' Steady" was "the only record we've never been able to find in the history of the pop charts." In the 4th edition of Whitburn's book Bubbling Under the Hot 100, published in 2005, the entry for "D. A." was amended with a note stating "the existence of this record and artist is in question." One of the more recent editions of Whitburn's book Billboard's Top Pop Singles 1955–2010, published in 2011, includes both Top 100 and Bubbling Under singles, but D. A. was not listed. In 2016, researcher Paul Haney finally located a tape recording of the song but determined that it had never been pressed onto a vinyl record or commercially released in any form, and that a record promoter had nevertheless managed to get the song on the Billboard chart. "D. A." was Dennis Armand Lucchesi (June 5, 1945 – August 18, 2005), a California-based mortgage broker and part-time musician.
