= Happy Face Hill =

Landmark in Simi Valley, California, United States

Coordinates: 34.2801°N 118.6656°W

Happy Face Hill is a landmark located in Simi Valley, California featuring a 150-foot-wide smiley face that overlooks the California State Route 118. It was created in 1998 by gardener Sonny Klamerus, a resident of neighboring Northridge, Los Angeles, who originally trespassed on the property in order to gain access, and considered it a "practical joke." The Hill gained a favorable reception among the community and became a notable landmark within the years following. It is currently maintained by the Simi Valley Sunrise Rotary Club and community volunteers.

== History ==
Klamerus claims to have made Happy Face Hill in 1998 as a prank and trespassed on land owned by a development company to create the work. The Hill was quickly embraced by the local community, and local residents volunteered in the succeeding years to assist with maintenance, brush clearance, and cosmetic adjustments. Today, the Hill is owned by a private Homeowner association who grant access to the property for preservation purposes.

The Hill has undergone several notable changes, with the addition of solar-powered lights, an adjustment in the angle of the smile, and spotlights aimed at the hillside. In anticipation for the festival celebrating the 50th Anniversary of Little House on the Prairie, the hill was covered in thousands of blue and yellow flags.

The Hill is currently maintained by members of the Simi Valley Sunrise Rotary Club, who also produce an annual Happy Face Music Festival in reference to the landmark.

== In popular culture ==
A photograph of Happy Face Hill posted May 2, 2024, by model Gigi Hadid on Instagram received over 2,900,000 likes.

== See also ==
- Ventura County Historic Landmarks & Points of Interest
