= Happy Line =

Shenzhen monorail line

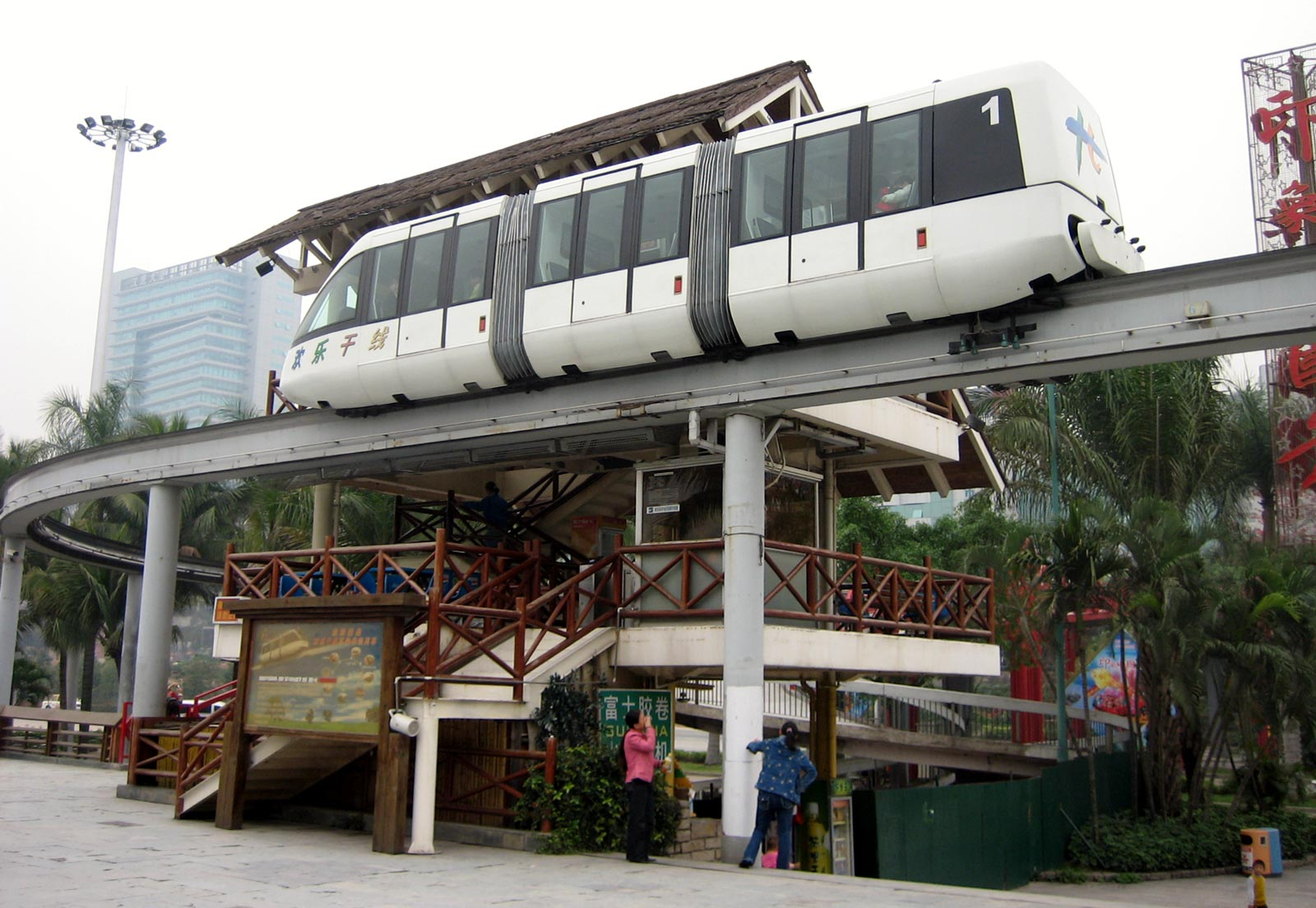

Overview
- Locale: Shenzhen
- Transit type: straddle-beam monorail
- Number of lines: 1
- Number of stations: 7

Operation
- Began operation: 16 February 1999; 27 years ago
- Ended operation: 1 November 2018; 8 years ago
- Number of vehicles: 5

Technical
- System length: 3.88 km (2.41 mi)
- Track gauge: 500 mm (19 3/4 in)
- Electrification: 380 V 50 Hz AC

The Happy Line was a monorail line in central Shenzhen. The line was a loop and has seven stations, including stops at Splendid China, Happy Valley, Window of the World, and China Folk Culture Village.

== Technical information ==
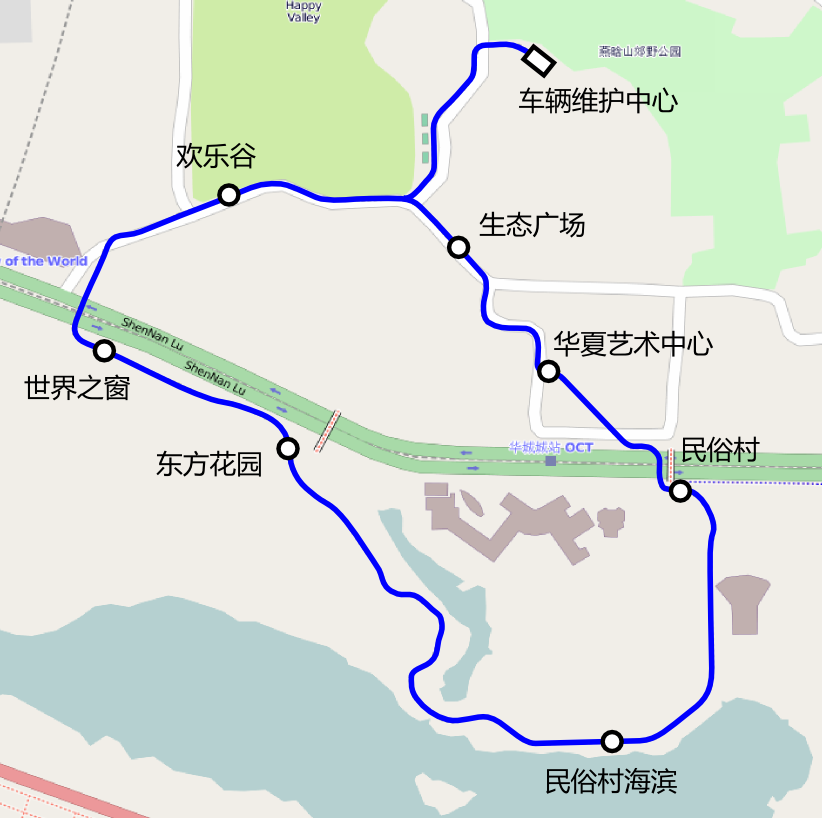
Happy Line route map

The monorail trains were built by Intamin with a fleet of five P28/24 class, three-car trains, each with a capacity of 24 passengers per train. The trains use 380 V 50 Hz AC power supply, and are equipped with four 15 kW (20 hp) AC motors and two 75 kW (101 hp) variable-frequency drives. Under normal circumstances, there are 5 trains running on the track at the same time.

The line features a maximum grade of 10%. The monorail beam was 500 mm (20 in) wide and 700 mm (28 in) tall, and has a support column every 15 metres (49 ft). Its maximal speed was 40 km per hour.

== Operations ==
The operating hours of Happy Route are 9:30 am – 6:30 pm on weekdays and 9 am – 7 pm on weekends. The actual traveling speed was about 20 km/h (12 mph), and it takes about 25 minutes for the train to complete the circle. The fare was RMB 50.

== Accident ==
At 11am on 1 November 2018, a system failure occurred on the Happy Line, causing a collision between the third and fourth cars carrying more than 20 people. This accident caused one person a head injury, one person a waist injury and other passengers with minor injuries to varying degrees.
