= My Happiness =

My Happiness may refer to:

- My Happiness (album), 2014 album by Amanda Lear
- "My Happiness" (1948 song), a 1948 song written by Betty Peterson Blasco and Borney Bergantine
- "My Happiness" (Powderfinger song) (2000)
- "My Happiness", a song by Daniel O'Donnell from Together Again (2007)
- Счастье моё, 2010 Russian language film released as My Happiness or My Joy
