= Happy (restaurant) =

Bulgarian casual dining chain

- Type: Private
- Industry: Restaurant
- Genre: Casual dining
- Founded: 1994 (32 years ago)
- Founders: Orlin Popov
- Headquarters: Varna, Bulgaria
- Number of locations: 27 (2024)
- Area served: Bulgaria, Romania, Spain, United Kingdom
- Key people: Orlin Popov (CEO)
- Products: Burgers, chicken, steak, pasta, seafood, sushi, dessert, Bulgarian cuisine, Asian cuisine, fusion cuisine
- Website: happyrestaurants.com

Happy, also known as Happy Bar & Grill, is a Bulgarian restaurant chain founded in 1994 and headquartered in Varna, Bulgaria. It is the largest casual dining restaurant chain in Bulgaria. Since its founding in 1994, it has expanded to 27 locations as of 2024, including opening restaurants in Spain, the United Kingdom, and most recently Romania. The chain offers a wide selection in its menu, including burgers, chicken, steak, pasta, seafood, sushi, dessert, Bulgarian cuisine, Asian cuisine, fusion cuisine, and seasonal selections of other cuisines. In Bulgaria, the company runs its own delivery service and app, Happy Delivery, which it shares with its local sister restaurant chains.

As of October 2024, its parent company additionally owns and operates Italian food chain Burrata and fine dining chain Captain Cook in Bulgaria.

== History ==
Happy was founded by Orlin Popov when the first Happy restaurant opened in 1994 in Varna, Bulgaria. The restaurant's concept was seen as comparable to that of Hard Rock Cafe, adapted to the needs of the Bulgarian market. It opened its first restaurant outside of its home city of Varna in Ruse in 1997, and expanded to Plovdiv in 1999. It opened its first location in the country's capital of Sofia in 2000. The company ran restaurants with other brands as well, including one of its current sister chains, Captain Cook, and the group grew to a total of 20 locations spread out in seven cities and three of the country's summer resorts by 2002.

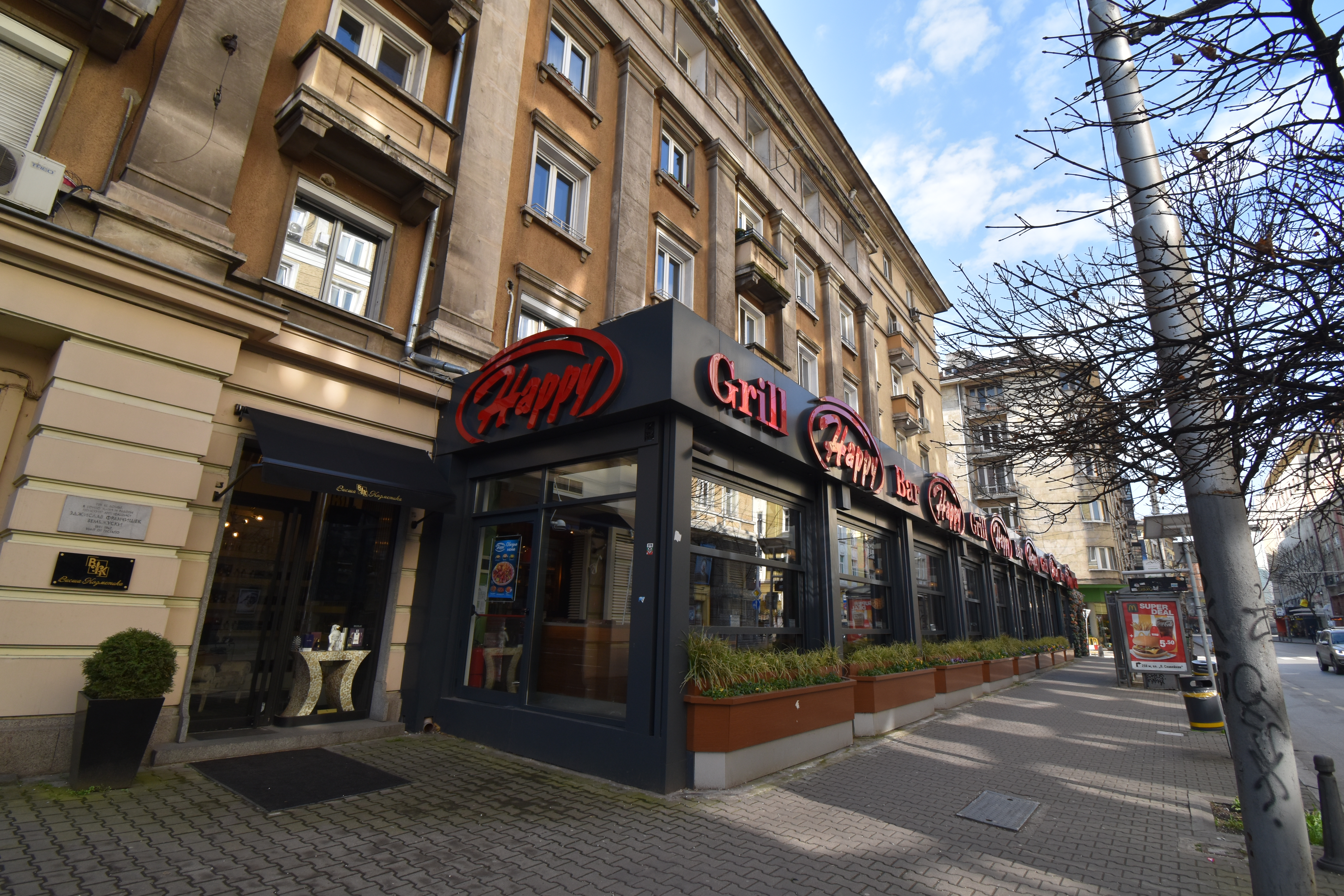
A location in Sofia.

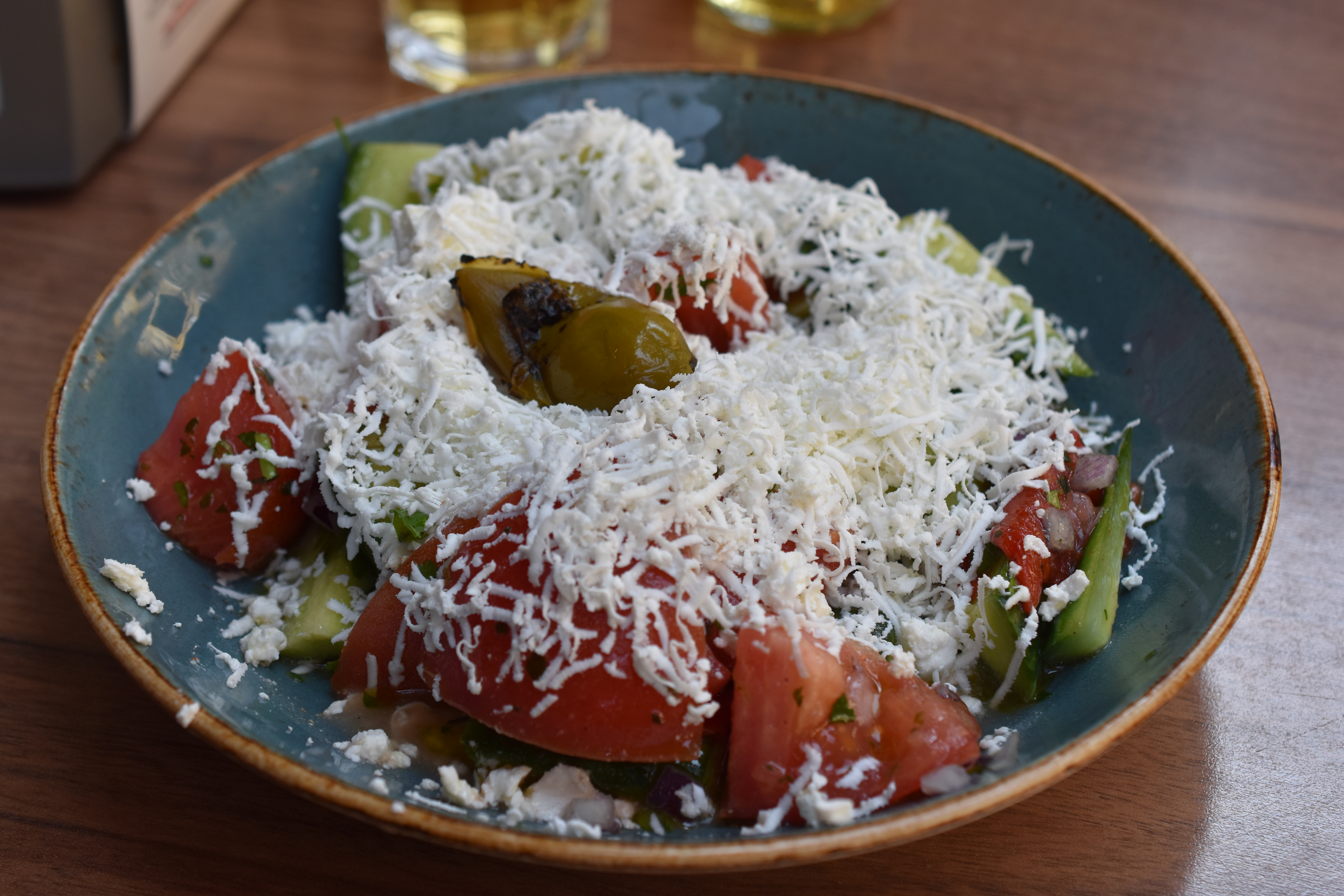
Shopska salad at Happy.

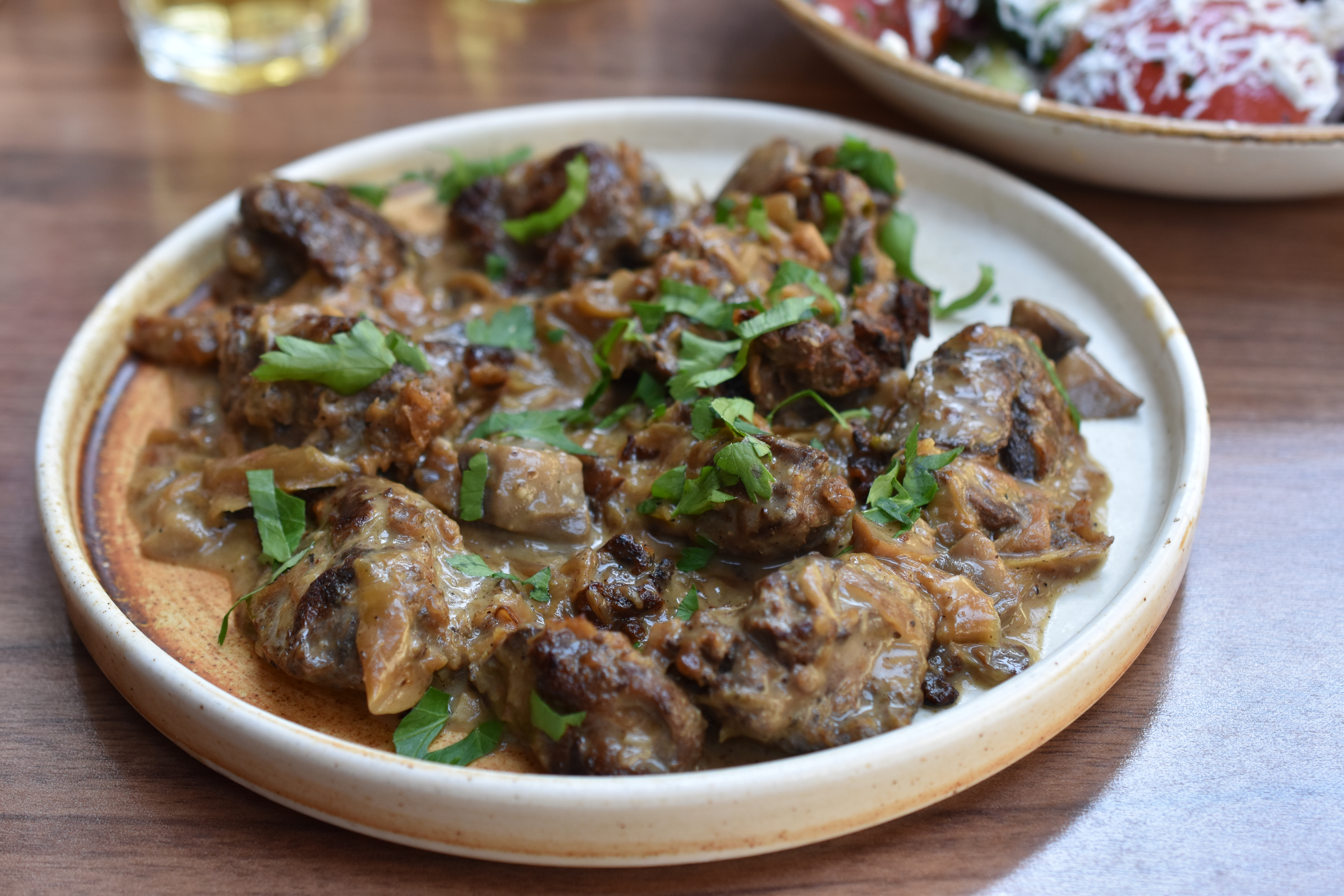
Drob po selski.

In 2004, it opened its first location outside of the country, with the opening of Happy Rock Bar & Grill in Barcelona, though significant growth continued to only be in Bulgaria. In later years, founder and CEO Orlin Popov would share that the company's initial attempts to expand to Spain with the same concept would lead to their first Spanish restaurant's bankruptcy in its first year. The Happy chain itself reached 20 restaurants in its home country in 2007, and 23 by 2020.

In 2019, the chain opened its first restaurant in the United Kingdom on Piccadilly in London, with ambitions to develop and sell a franchise model from there. In 2024, the first Happy restaurant in Romania opened in AFI Cotroceni in Bucharest, with plans to grow the chain's total number of locations worldwide to 70 by 2030.

The only Happy-branded restaurant in Spain, Happy Rock Bar & Grill, was temporarily closed in September 2023, and remains closed as of October 2024. The Happy Group, the local parent company, continues to run four other restaurants under different brands, including three in the country and one in Singapore.

== Controversy ==
In March 2026, the chain faced public scrutiny after an archived portfolio page from Bulgarian security vendor IP Biometrix was found to describe an AI facial recognition system developed for use in Happy restaurants. The system was marketed for monitoring employee smiles, but the vendor's portfolio materials also displayed capabilities for profiling customers, including tracking physical attributes, inferring ethnicity, and analysing emotional states, alongside data suggesting tens of thousands of faces had been processed. The story gained traction on social media and was covered by several Bulgarian news outlets.

On 12 March 2026, the company issued a statement acknowledging that it had evaluated an offer from GI Mobility Services, linked to IP Biometrix, between September and December 2023, but stated it formally rejected the proposal on 14 December 2023 and that the system was never deployed. The chain's published privacy policy does not mention facial recognition or biometric data processing. Bulgaria's Commission for Personal Data Protection has stated that processing biometric data in shops and restaurants for analysing customer behaviour cannot be based on legitimate interest under the GDPR.

== See also ==
- Restaurant chains
- List of restaurant chains
