= Happy Cube =

Mechanical puzzle

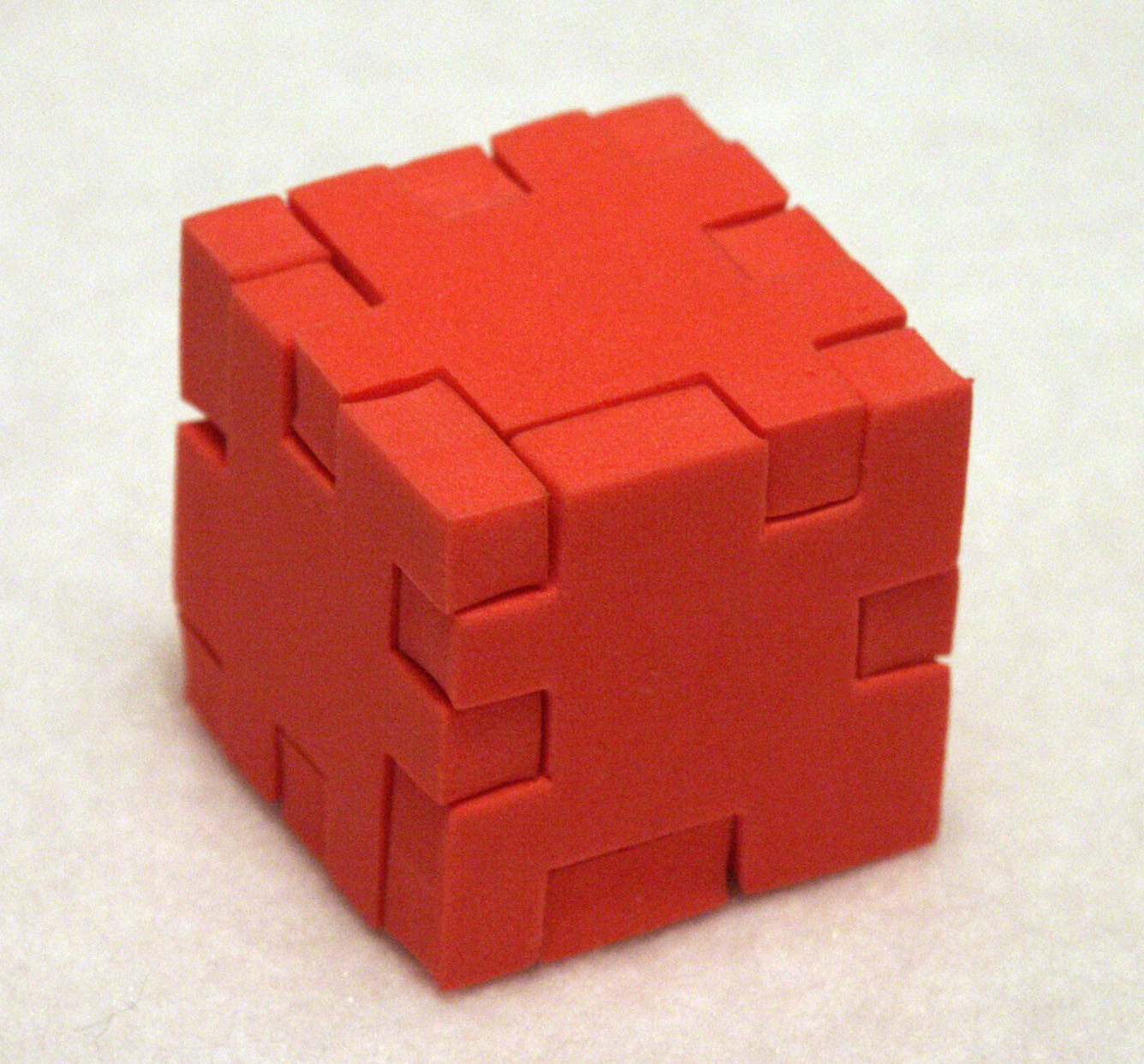
The Red Happy Cube

Happy Cubes are a set of mechanical puzzles created in 1986 by the Belgian toy inventor Dirk Laureyssens. The company "Happy bvba" has the exclusive license to manufacture and sell these puzzles. Happy Cubes are also known by a number of other names, including "Cube It!" cubes, "Wirrel Warrel" (in the Netherlands), "I.Q.ubes" and "Cococrash" (in Spain and Portugal).

The Happy Cubes were made of 8mm-thick ethylene-vinyl acetate foam mats (also known as EVA). The tiles were based upon a 5x5 matrix where the outer squares may be present or absent. The central 3x3 kernel was fixed. Initially the puzzle is assembled into a 2-dimensional, flat 2x3 piece rectangle fitted into a frame. The basic challenge is to construct a perfect, 6-sided cube out of these 6 pieces. Usually, there is only one way to fit the pieces into a complete cube and it can be reached with various levels of difficulty by trial and error.

== Variations ==
There are four families of Happy Cube puzzles, each containing 6 different cubes. Each family has a unique texture, style and difficulty level. Within each puzzle family the cubes are differentiated by color. The four families of Happy Cube puzzles with names of each puzzle are:

- Junior (formerly The Little Genius) - Textured with various icons of foods, vehicles, emotions etc.'. These are the easiest cubes to build and are designed for children aged three to seven years.
- Original (formerly The Happy Cube) - Plainly colored with a single color each and with no texture, medium difficulty. These are the original cubes that were designed by the inventor in 1986.
- Pro (formerly The Profi Cube) - Textured with two interleaving colors, rated by the manufacturer as slightly harder to build than the Happy Cubes (but see next section). There are two versions of this family, the first is colored with one dominant color and a black background and the newer version is much lighter in shade, replacing the black background with a second dominant color similar in shade to the first one. Named puzzles: Confusius (sic) (Blue), Da Vinci (green), Marco Polo (yellow), Rubens (orange), Watt (red), Newton (magenta).
- Expert (formerly The Marble Cube) - Textures as colored marble, rated as hardest difficulty by the manufacturer (but see next section). Named puzzles: Martin L King (blue), Omar Khayam (green), Marie Curie (yellow), Buckminster Fuller (red), Mahatma Gandhi (magenta), (Note: These are the names in the Marble set. When renamed to the Expert set, individual puzzle names were removed and the former Gandhi and Fuller puzzles swapped colour. I.e., the former-Gandhi puzzle is red in the Expert set and the former-Fuller puzzle is magenta.) Albert Einstein (purple).

== Difficulty Rankings ==
While the manufacturer lists the difficulty level of the sets (easiest to hardest) as Junior, Original, Pro, Expert, and within each set ranks the puzzles (easiest to hardest) as listed in the previous section, independent researchers have substantially disagreed with this arrangement saying the manufacturer's difficulty rankings within each set "do not contain any relevant information on the difficulty of the model". (Note: The Junior, Original, Pro and Expert sets no longer assign individual rankings to their component puzzles.)

The manufacturer's four easiest Pro puzzles are rated by the researchers as harder than the manufacturer's two hardest Pro puzzles and harder than any of the Expert puzzles. Using P for Pro, E for Expert, and the digits 1 (lower difficulty) to 6 (higher) their rankings are:

- Set I (easier): E2, E5, E6, P5, P6, E1
- Set II (harder): E3, E4, P1, P3, P2, P4

== Solutions ==
The basic challenge of the Happy Cubes puzzles is to construct a single perfect cube from the 6 pieces of a single puzzle which share the same color scheme and texture. A subsequent challenge to this is to fit the pieces back into the 2-dimensional frame from which they came.

With the presence of more than one puzzle available, pieces of several different cube puzzles can be joined to make up larger and more complex structures other than the basic 6 faced cube. Some structures are more difficult to construct than others and the more pieces available, the easier it is to find a solution that makes a closed shape since there are more options of pieces to choose from. With enough pieces, virtually any structure imaginable can be constructed.

Two of the most popular complex structures are the 2×2×2 cube which is a perfect cube with each face made of 4 pieces (all in all, 24 pieces) and the Star structure, which is made of 6 cubes attached in a single-cube sized common centre (all in all, 30 pieces). Several computer applications exist to aid in the process of designing large structures and finding solutions for them automatically.

== Competitors and Promotions ==
Another popular brand of puzzle based on the exact same idea is Snafooz, made by Idea Group inc. The main difference between the two is that Happy Cube pieces measure five units per side whereas Snafooz measure six. This resulted in a lawsuit, Laureyssens v. Idea Group, Inc., in 1992

It was popular in the '90s for companies to have their logos printed on such cubes and distribute them as a form of advertising. Companies that were known to do this included Apple Computer, Caterpillar Inc., and Enron.

Foam cube puzzles have also been made in 8x8 arrangements. The National Museum of Mathematics sold such puzzles with its URL (momath.org) printed on them.
