= Happiness (Bill Anderson song) =

Single by Ken Dodd
- B-side: "All of My Life"
- Released: 1964
- Genre: Easy listening, pop
- Length: 1:55
- Label: Columbia DB 7325
- Songwriter: Bill Anderson

Ken Dodd singles chronology
"Beautiful Dreamer" (1963)	"Happiness" (1964)	"So Deep Is the Night" (1964)

"Happiness" is a song written by American country musician Bill Anderson, and first recorded by Anderson on his 1963 album Still.

In the United Kingdom, the song is best known in the version by comedian and singer Ken Dodd. Dodd's recording, arranged by Ivor Raymonde and released on EMI's Columbia label, reached number 31 on the UK Singles Chart in 1964. Although not one of Dodd's biggest chart hits, it became known as the comedian's signature song.

A version of the song was used as the theme for the 2001 UK TV series Happiness. The song is traditionally played by Cheltenham Town FC at home matches following a victory. The song has also been covered by Foster and Allen on their album Putting On The Style.

During the COVID-19 pandemic in 2020, the song was recorded as a tribute to the National Health Service by celebrities from the Liverpool area, including Ricky Tomlinson, Glenda Jackson, Rick Astley, Jimmy Tarbuck, Shirley Ballas, Claire Sweeney, Les Dennis and Carol Decker. The video was released by the Ken Dodd Charitable Foundation, in association with the Comedy Trust and the Royal Court Theatre.
