= Put On a Happy Face =

Put On a Happy Face may refer to:

- "Put On a Happy Face" (song) from 1960 American musical Bye Bye Birdie
- Put On a Happy Face (album) by Oscar Peterson Trio, recorded in 1962
- "Put On a Happy Face", episode of Grey's Anatomy season 16
- "Put On a Happy Face", episode of Everwood
