= Baishizhou =

Coordinates: 22°32′12″N 113°57′48″E

Baishizhou 白石洲
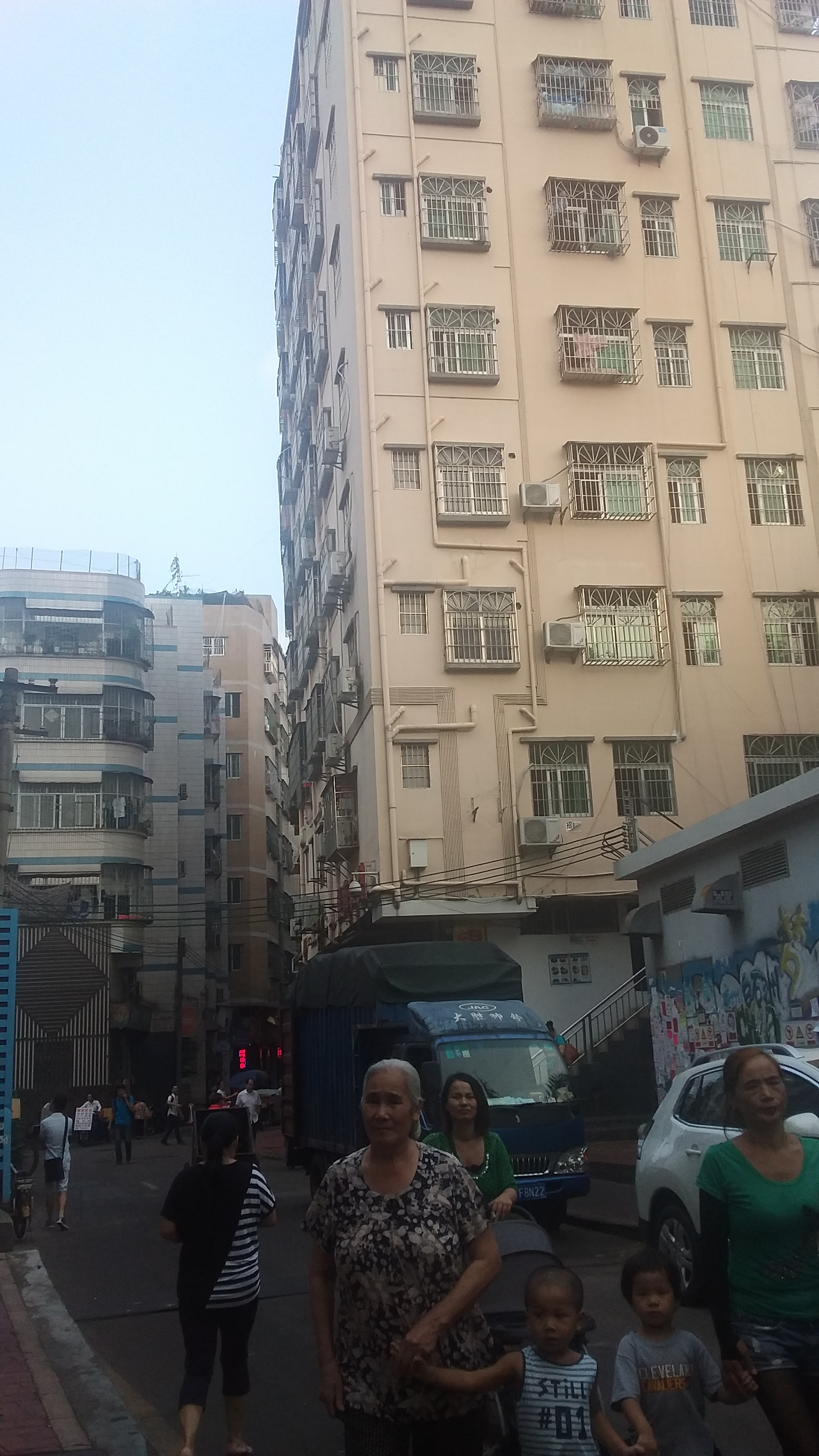
- Baishizhou
- Interactive map of Baishizhou
- Country: China
- Province: Guangdong
- First settled: 1795
- Village merged: 1958
- SEZ formed: 1 May 1980

Area
  - Urban: 0.60 km^{2} (0.23 sq mi)

Population
  - Urban: 150,000
  - Urban density: 250,000/km^{2} (650,000/sq mi)
  - Major ethnicities: Han
- Time zone: UTC+8 (China Standard)
- Area code: 755
- Licence plate prefixes: 粤B
- Climate: Monsoon-influenced humid subtropical climate (Cwa)

Baishizhou (Chinese: 白石洲; pinyin: Báishízhōu; Jyutping: baak6 sek6 zau1) is an area of Nanshan District, Shenzhen, Guangdong, China. As of 2016, about 150,000 people live in Baishizhou. With an area of 0.23 square miles (0.60 km^{2}), it has the most inhabitants, as well as the highest building and population density, of any urban village within Shenzhen. Accounting for unregistered and undocumented residents, some estimates of Baishizhou's rental population are well above two hundred thousand.

In 2014 Charlie Lanyon of The South China Morning Post described it as "one of the last vestiges of old Shenzhen".

== History ==
Before the introduction of the Shenzhen Special Economic Zone and subsequent mass-migration to the area, the village of Baishizhou had been a destination of immigrants and refugees for centuries. The first settlers, the Wu clan of Gongming, migrated south into Baishizhou in 1795 from northwestern Shenzhen, leading to the founding of a Qing Dynasty habitat named "Village of the Ten Thousand Families". The area remained an agricultural one, with harvesting of oysters and cultivation of rice being the main industries.

In 1958, administrative changes led to five historical villages merging together to form an agricultural collective farm, called the Shahe Farm, the precursor to the modern-day Baishizhou area. These historical settlements, known as the Shahe Five Villages, included Baishizhou proper along with Shangbaishi, Xiabaishi, Xintang and Tangtou.

The Special Economic Zone reforms in 1979 led to the rapid urbanisation of Shenzhen. The municipal government acquired cheaper rural agricultural land around the village of Baishizhou, without purchasing the residential land. This led to the encircling of the village by modern developments, leading to its current form as an urban village.

In 1985, the eastern part of the village was developed to form the Overseas Chinese Town, a 4.8 square kilometer zone, designated to be an industry and tourism district for foreign businesses. The Overseas Chinese Town houses the Window of the World theme park, featuring miniature replicas of global landmarks, visited by over 3.25 million tourists per year. The zone also includes Happy Valley Shenzhen, an amusement park, and Splendid China Folk Village, a cultural theme park.

In 2014, the Shenzhen government announced that it was going to demolish existing developments and redevelop Baishizhou, with another in 2019.

== Culture ==
The culture of Baishizhou has been heavily shaped by its status as a first point of arrival for immigrants into Shenzhen, bringing unique traditions from all across China.

Lanyon noted the abundance of street food and stated that the cuisine was inexpensive and also "excellent".

== Transportation ==
- Baishizhou Station, Shenzhen Metro

== Education ==
Shenzhen Saturday School (深圳補習授業校 Shinsen Hoshū Jugyō Kō), a Japanese weekend school, has its office on the 8th floor of the Jinsanjiao Building (金三角大厦/金三角大廈) in Baishizhou.

Baishizhou
- Chinese: 深圳
- Hanyu Pinyin: Báishízhōu
- Literal meaning: "White Stone Sandbar"
Transcriptions
Standard Mandarin
- Hanyu Pinyin: Báishízhōu
- IPA: [pǎɪ.ʂǐ.ʈʂóʊ]
Yue: Cantonese
- Jyutping: baak^{6} sek^{6} zau^{1}
- IPA: [pak̚˨.sɛk̚˨.tsɐw˥]

== See also ==
- Urban village (China)
