= Shipai Village =

Chinese transcription(s)
  - Chinese: 石牌村
  - Pinyin: Shípái
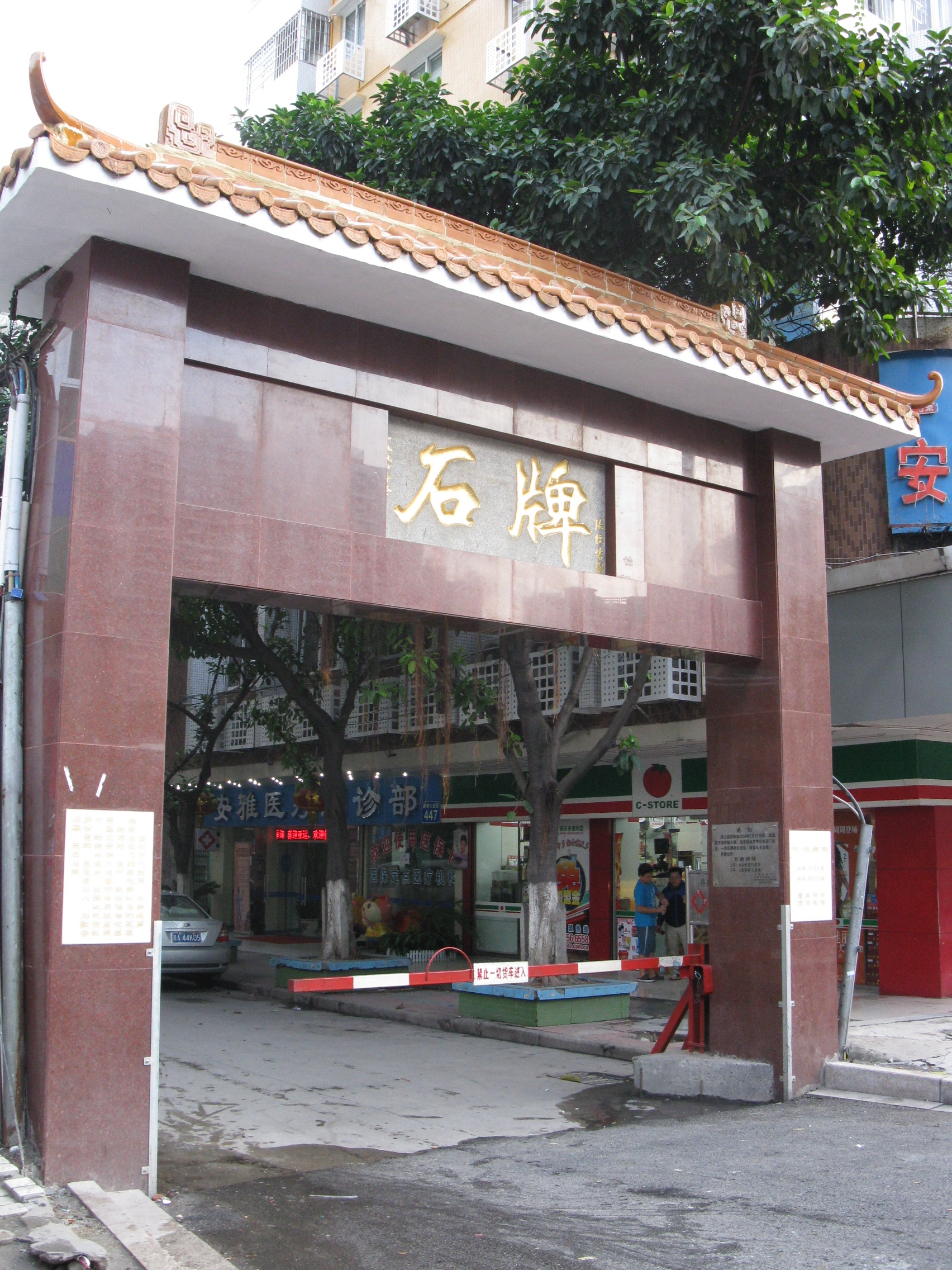
- a gateway into Shipai Village

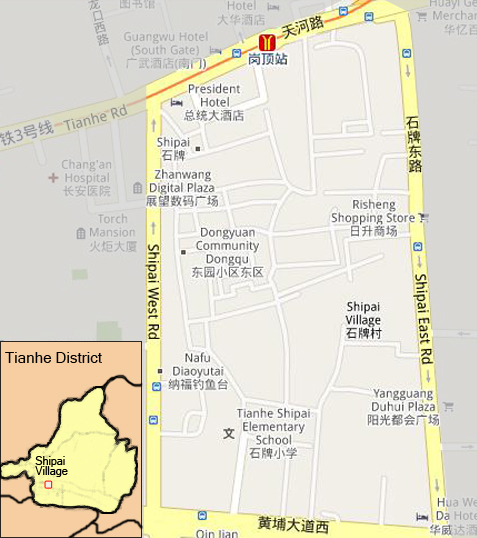
- Shipai Village
- Coordinates: 23°07′50″N 113°20′23″E
- District: Tianhe
- City: Guangzhou

Area
  - Total: 6 km^{2} (2.3 sq mi)
- Time zone: UTC+8 (China Standard)
- Postal code: 510630
- Area code: 020

Shipai Village (Chinese: 石牌; Hanyu Pinyin: Shípái; Tongyong Pinyin: Shíhpái; Jyutping: Sek^{6}paai^{4}) is the largest urban village in Guangzhou, China. It is situated in the middle of Tianhe District in Guangzhou, with dense multi-story dwelling houses building in and lands for collective use. The village is supported by 170 narrow alleys yet surrounded by tall buildings and busy commercial streets. There are many shopping and entertaining centers as well as several institutions of higher education such as Jinan University nearby.

Shipai Village has a variety of traditional cultural relics and some examples of historic architecture. It mixes the elements of tradition and modernization and it serves as a "bridge" between rural areas and the city.

== Overview ==
=== Geography ===
Shipai is a village in the center of Tianhe District in Guangzhou. Followed by the changes of the times, its range has been narrowing and its location has been changing. When the Republic of China was founded (1912), Shipai had an area of 14 km², which contains 4800 hectares of cultivated land and hills, pools, wasteland and dwelling houses. With the unification of China under Kuomintang Government and local economic achievement, municipal government confiscated the land on the northern and eastern part of Shipai in use of building horse-court, Shipai Campus of Sun Yat-Sen University, weather station, etc., which covers around 5 km². In the 1950s, the northern part of the village was occupied as a garrison for PLA, while several universities were established, such as South University (South China Normal University today), Jinan University, The Guangdong Administrative Institute of Education (The 3rd Affiliated Hospital of Sun Yat-sen University today), which further narrowed the range of the village to 6 km² or so. From 1978 to 1996, cultivated land had been expropriated and since 1996 there have been only lands left for dwelling and collective use. Nowadays, the village covers 1 km² that ranges from Shipai Rd. E. to Shipai Rd. W.; from Tianhe Rd in the north to Huangpu Av. in the south.

=== History ===
Early records of Shipai Village can be tracked back to the Song dynasty. In 1273, ancestor Dong Yilong (董裔隆) and his family migrated from Nanxiong to where the village locates today, which later on developed into small hamlet called "Dongcun" (董村). With the population growth, Dong's descendants moved to higher land, which was located on the north-western side of "Miaobiangang" (庙边岗). Then, descendants of surname Chi (池) who had lived in "Xiǎnké qiáng" (蚬壳墙) for nearly 100 years moved to the north-eastern side of "Miaobiangang" (庙边岗). Gradually, two places of Dong and Chi merged into one and finally during the reign of the Chenghua Emperor in the Ming dynasty (1465–1487), the name of the hamlet was changed as "Miaobiangang".

As population spread after a century of development, people of different surname (Dong, Chi, Pan, Chen) from different places around Miaobiangang maintained close tie with each other, and made a small hamlet into a big village. Soon it formed a flea market of considerable scale. Since the market was in front (qian) of a hill (shan), people began to call it "Shanqian Shichang" (market in front of the hill). In the reign of the Jiajing Emperor in the Ming dynasty, name of the village changed to "Shipai". Until year of 1552, Shipai Village was under jurisdiction of Yongtai County.

In the beginning of the Qing dynasty, Shipai Village is a well-known village. In 1686, the local government set up 18 legal villages, all under control by a governmental branch that was named after Shipai Village. This governmental branch was not withdrawn until 1931.

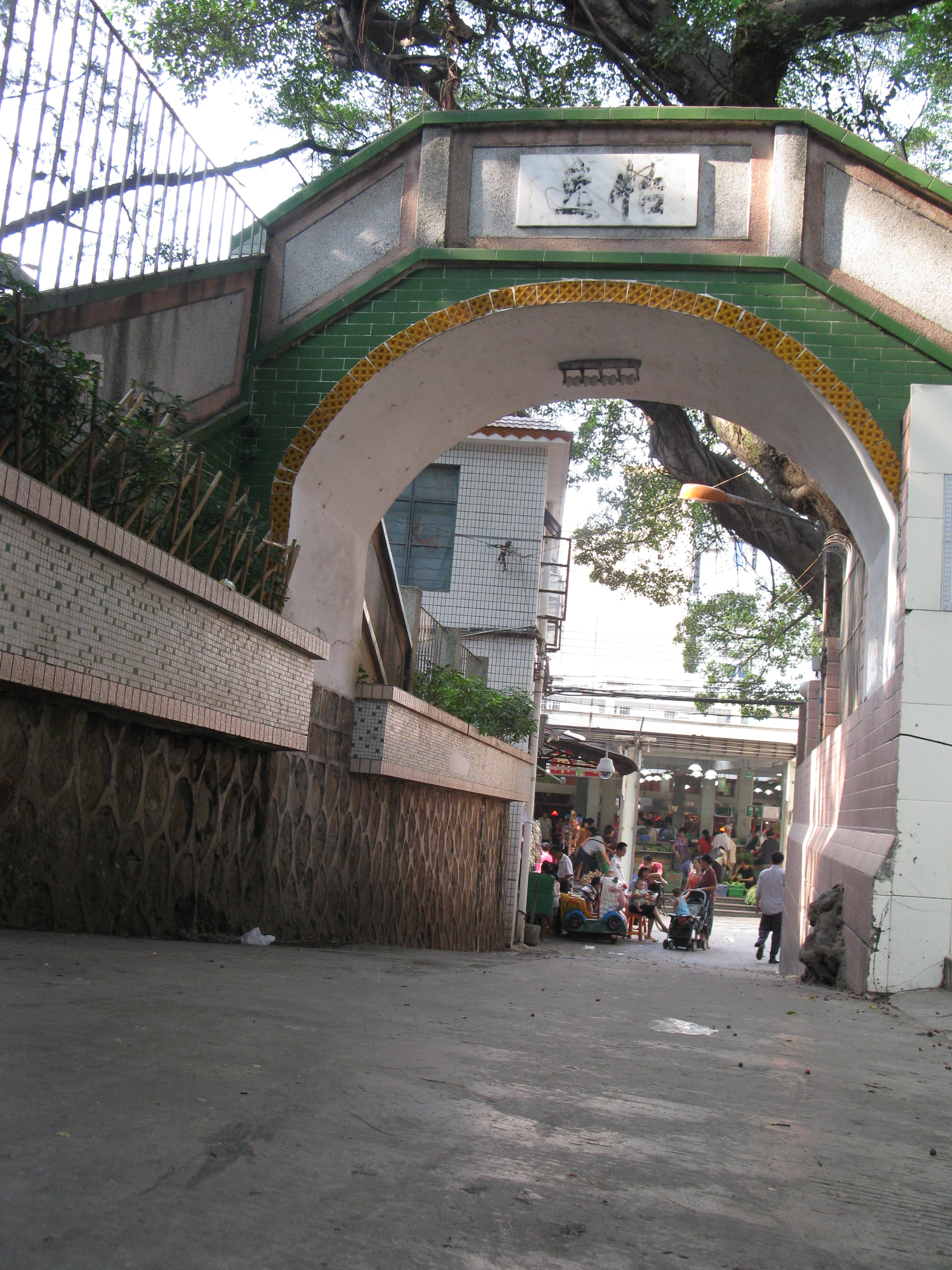
Road to the Shanqian market, in 2010

During the reign of the Jiaqing Emperor in Qing dynasty (1796–1820), there formed about 20 main streets radiated from Shanqian Market (山前市场), which have maintained up to the present day. In 1828, with funds raised by villagers, main streets and some of the alleys were placed by stripes of slates.

For almost a century since the reign of the Daoguang Emperor, Shipai Village had been enjoying both economic and population growth. In 1938-1949 however, during the Second Sino-Japanese War, poverty and famine pervaded the village.

Since 1949, Shipai Village serves not only as a natural village, but also as an administrative village that concludes three natural villages (Shipai, Xinqing and East-Shipai). Shipai Village is surrounded by the city today and has become the largest urban village in Guangzhou.

=== Demographics ===
Population of Shipai Village consists of local residents and non-native floating population. Before 1949, few exotic people live here except for some military troop and police. With the switch of regime, more and more people from different parts of the country started to settle in, whether it be permanently or temporarily. Since 1978 when Deng's reform was launched, exotic population has grown tremendously. They come from all over the country (mostly from rural areas) dwelling in houses rented from villagers and earn their living in the city, most of whom are driven by economic forces.

Census 1999 recorded Shipai as having a native population of 9,317 (1,994 families). Census 2,000 recorded a non-native floating population of 42,000. The population density was 51,181/km²(including non-native floating population).

As for the local residents, population had been roaring since the very beginning until in the 1980s when the One Child Policy was forcefully executed. While exotic people are moving in, local residents are moving out. A group of villagers moved to Hong Kong, Singapore during Kuomintang period, other move farther such as to US and to Canada. Since the foundation of Sanjun Group Company, villager-funded housing project has initiated and most of the villagers have moved into their new communities.

== Economy ==
=== Economy before urbanization ===
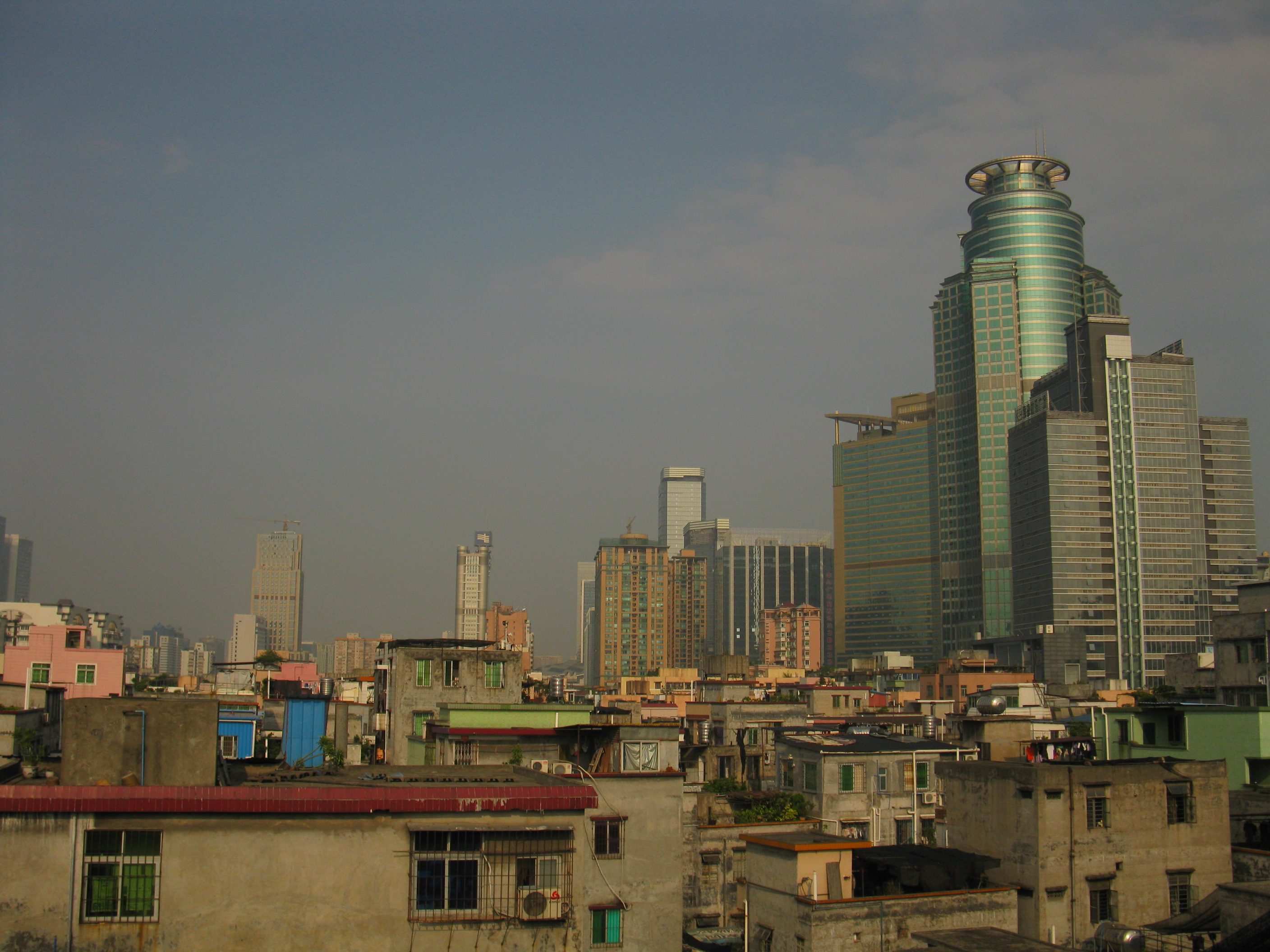
Village and the city, in 2010

Before the area was urbanized, the process of economic development in Shipai could be divided into three phrases: Before agrarian reform; agrarian reform; collectivization of agriculture.

Before agrarian reform, Shipai developed in a healthy path due to its excellent geographical environment, agricultural history as well as strong influence from the city. In the early years of Kuomintang’s governance (1928–1936), economy boosted in Canton, villagers received good harvest and had a good deal. Then because of the invasion and occupation of Japanese armies, production was encumbered, houses were damaged, economy went into a tail spin. In 1946, one year after the war, Shipai was rebuilt with the help of UNRRA.

Ancient China was famous for its peasant economy and so it had limited development in terms of agrarian technology and commercial exchange. But Shipai was one of the exceptions for its cash farming and cash crop. In the 1940s, villagers began to use chemical fertilizer and pesticide as a way of increasing production. Early in 1948-1949, there was 4800 mu of cultivated land, of which 3840 mu were paddy fields, providing with some 500,000 kg paddy rice for the city and 960 mu were vegetable fields, 3,000,000 kg to the city. Shipai was once famous for its fine ageratum, which served as special product that spread widely to the country and overboard.

From Oct.1950 to Sep. 1952, agrarian reform was launched in Shipai. Almost 1124.77 mu of land was confiscated from landlords and other 2922.05 mu from farmers, entrepreneurs, capitalists, tenants, and clan, all of which were then redistributed to peasants with no or few lands. In the wake of reform since 1953, several movements had been launched in succession, such as collectivization, the Great Leap Forward, the movement to establish people's communes, and finally the Cultural Revolution. During these years, lands were centralized, economy fell, people starved and tradition ruined. It was not until 30 years later in the 1980s when lands were redistributed again that the village began to reinvigorate. In 1983, villagers were able to produce extra vegetable apart from those which were to turn over to the state. Nov. 1984, price of vegetable was open to free negotiation in the market, vegetable production in Shipai roared up.

=== Transformation during urbanization ===
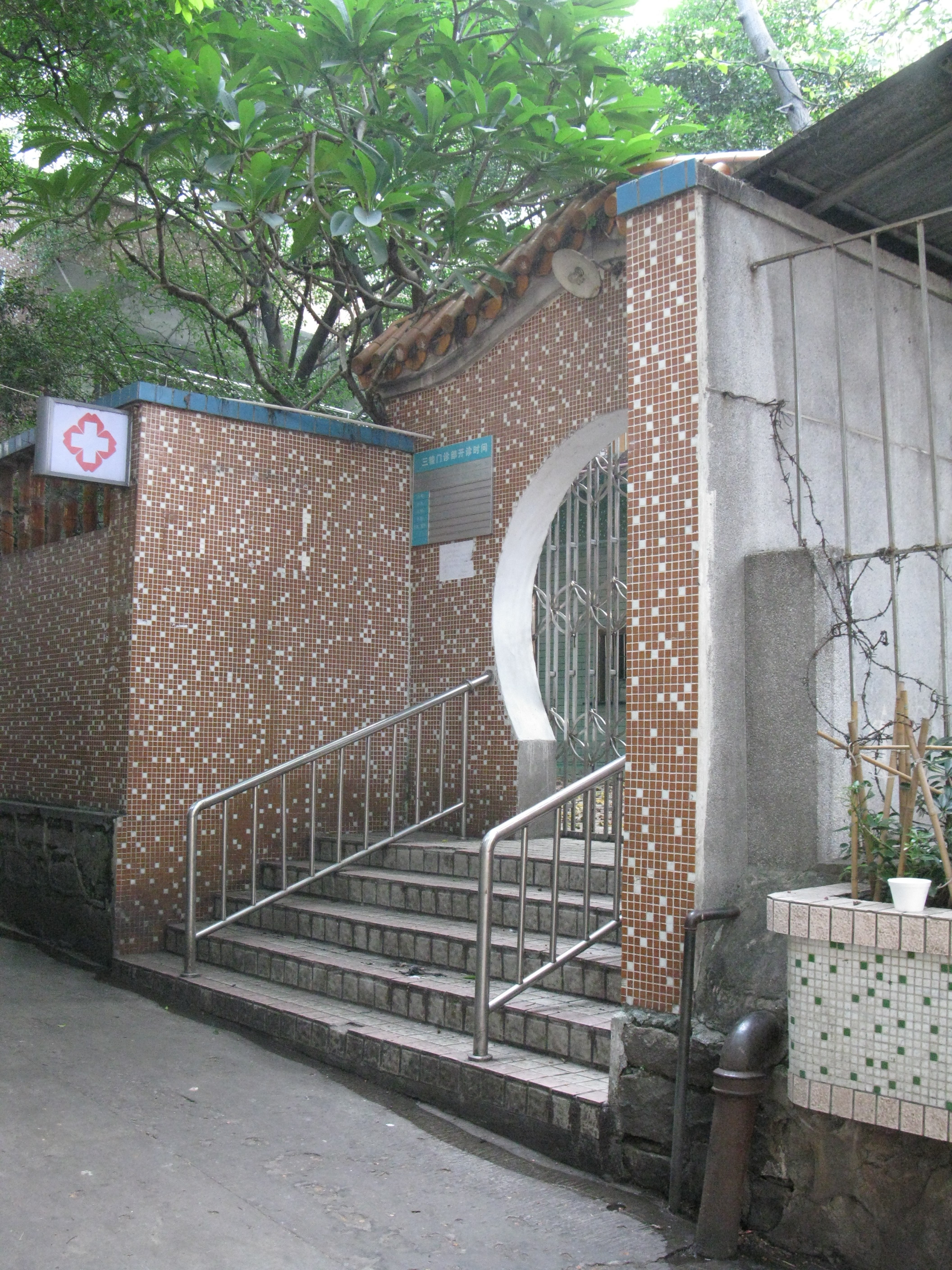
Local medical service station, in 2010

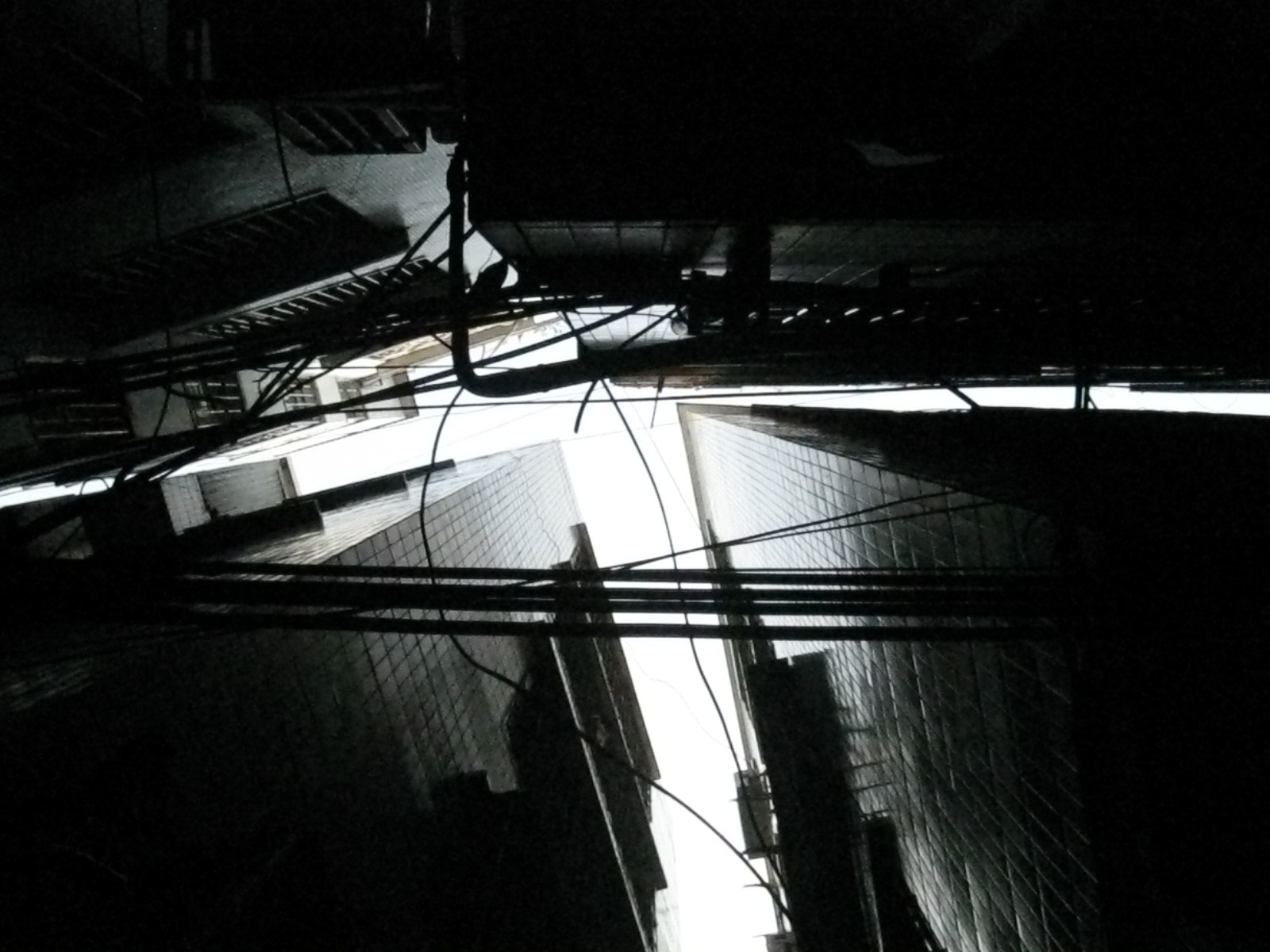
Light shone through the dwelling buildings, in 2010

The transformation of Shipai economy can be expressed in a resource sense as a process of changing pattern from land to and then to estate. As to management system, it turned thereupon from household contract system to stock-cooperative system and finally the administrative branch became a property company that deals with the collectively owned land.

With urbanization in Guangzhou speeding up, land in pre-rural areas are either being appropriated or surrounded by the city. Such challenge forced villagers to give up their tilling and start building. For the rest of its collectively owned land, they set up a property company called Sanjun Group Company and all villagers became shareholders. With such step, economy began to leap. From 1988 to 1997, the total income of its collective economy increased by 763%, net income 615%, the economical entity worth 40 times of its origin. The built-up area of its property grew from 193,900m² in 1996 to 250,000 m² in 2000 and the annual earning of the company is above 200 million yuan.

Apart from the collective economy, individual economy turned as well. On one hand villagers’ income increased tremendously due to the opening of marketing price; on the other hand, since urbanization struck the city, to which more and more people flooded, villagers raised their income as capital to rebuild their own houses for rent, which ended the era of tilling. Most of villagers are now rent collectors, and some of them are doing other business as well.

=== Community management mode ===
As an administrative village before the 1980s in the time of planned economy, Shipai was wove as a production brigade that contained 27 "production teams", of which terms are still being called by villagers today. In 1982, production brigade was replaced by village neighborhood committee, but it soon turned as the leadership of its property company Sanjun established in 1997, of which villagers are shareholders and the amount of one’s shares are determined by the land one occupied and work one had done. Business as the company runs, and boards of directors and supervisors as the company has, Sanjun is more of a state enterprise than a private enterprise, which is ruled by party officials and responsible mostly for the local administration and villagers’ welfare such as schooling, medical care, security, sanitation and entertainment.

=== House rental trend ===
With people around the country swarming into the city during the process of urbanization, villagers rebuild their houses and rent them out for outsiders who can only pay low rent. Intriguing as it is, the rental services has developed so rapidly that it becomes the main source of villagers’ income. Also, it provide with dwelling places for outside people to pursue their own dreams.

== Life of villagers ==
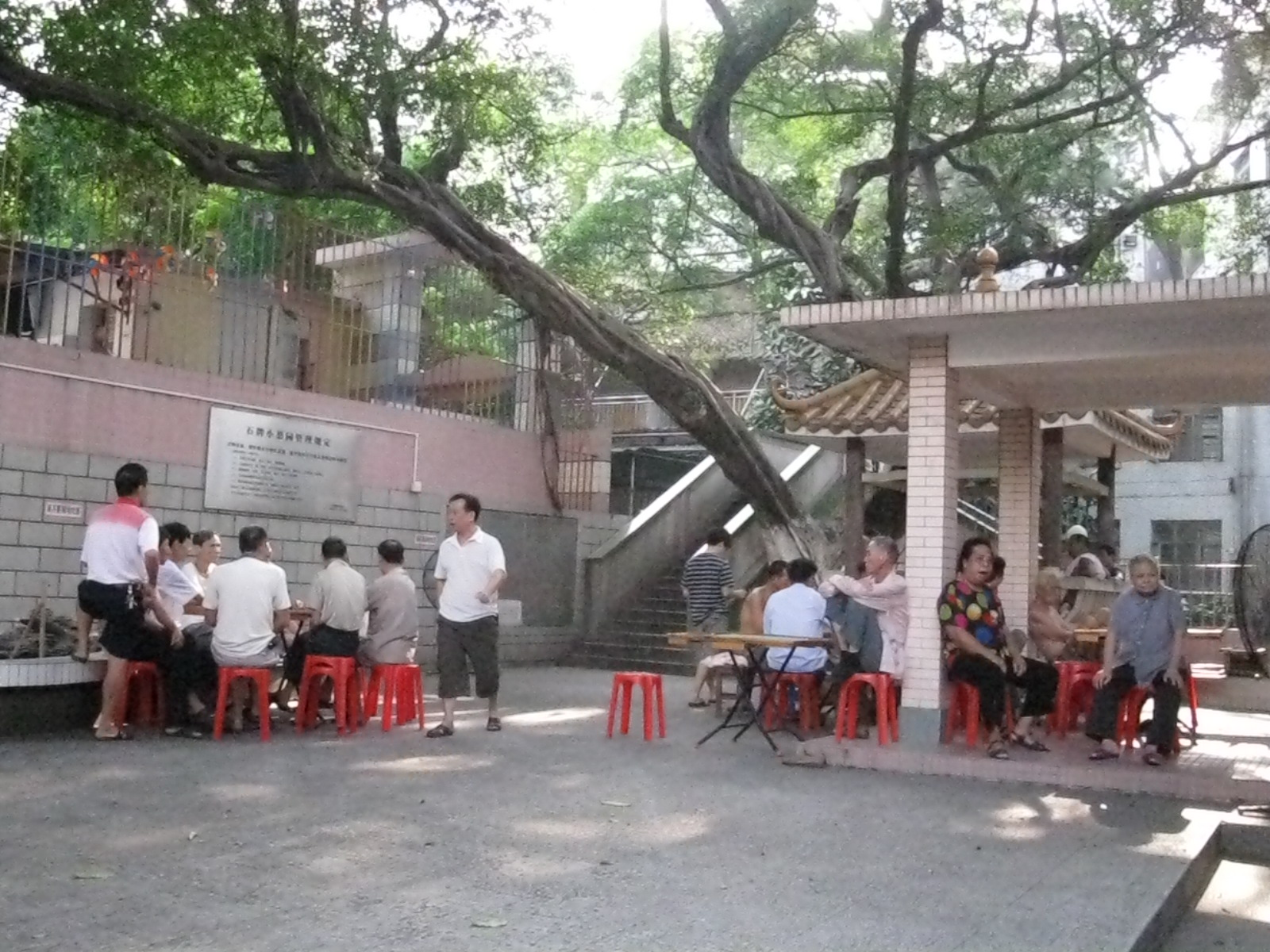
Elderly in shelter garden, in 2010

As the area becomes urbanized, villagers' life bears little difference with that of ordinary Cantonese, of which "chen yun" (morning walking) and "yin cha" (having morning tea) are of important part. But the connections between individuals are more intensive and everlasting in the village and it is the same in terms of friendship. Playing mah-jong is one of the most popular activities for housewives.

== Growth environment and its education ==
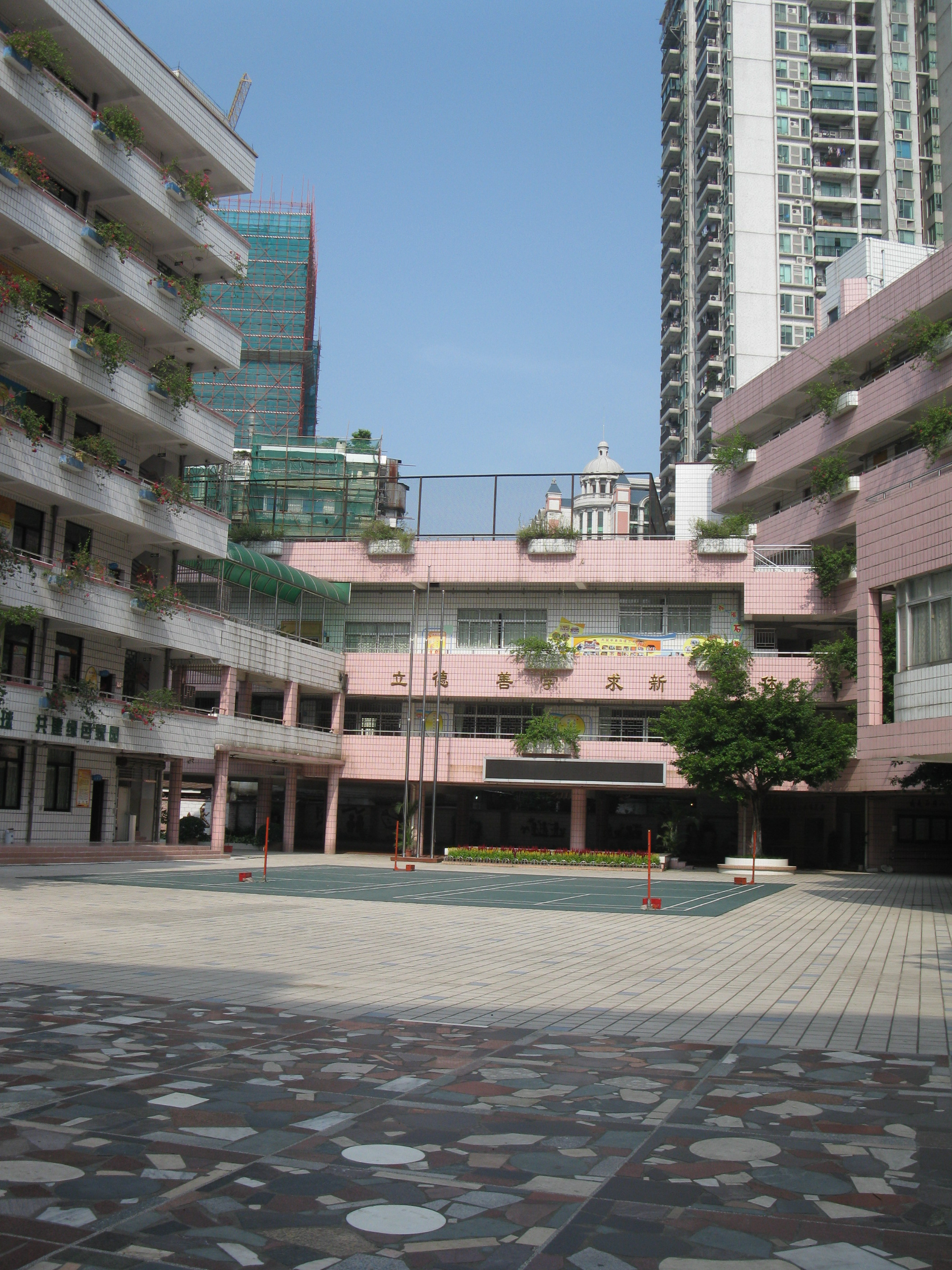
Shipai Primary School, in 2010

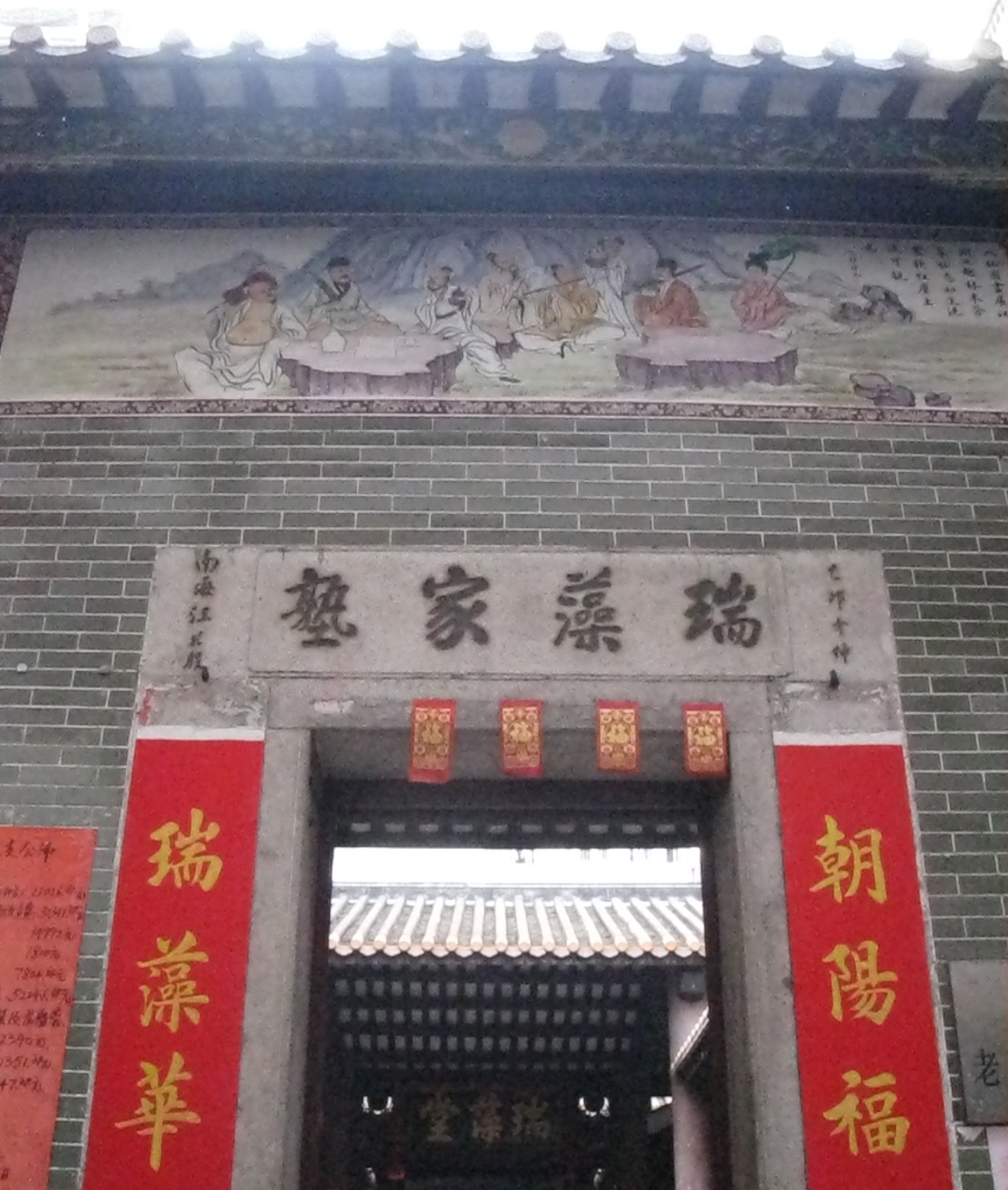
Jui Tsao Private School, in 2010

=== Growth environment ===
Shipai was well known in area adjacent to it for its economic success, but it was also well known for its traditional education. Local colleges and si shus (private schools) were built and some of their buildings are still erecting there for various utilities. In the time of ROC after educational reform, several educational institutions (such as Sun Yat-Sen National University and Jinan University) built their campus around Shipai, which also built a sense of atmosphere of culture. And indeed, villagers once enlisted help from Sun Yat-Sen National University in order to wipe out illiteracy.

Since the 1980s, district around Shipai has developed so rapidly that it became one of the most prosperous places in Guangzhou. Shipai Rd. W is famous for computer market while Shipai Rd. E is famous for boutique. The area encompassing the villages is erected with hotels, office buildings, malls and so forth, which creates millions of jobs and absorbs nearly 50,000 people in all fields dwelling in the village. Such mutation of circumstances took profound influence on villagers’ life style, which demands knowledge of management, language, calculation and even computer.

=== Education ===
In history, education was not in absence here. In 1781, Lu Shan College (鹿山书院) (which was ruined in 1925) was set up. At that time, Lu Shan College was considered as the highest educational institution among villages outside Canton. Then Tung Tse College (同泽书院), a joint institution of three villages (Shipai, Tangxia, Yuancun) was set up in 1854, serving as a place to read classical works of Confucius and practice Wushu.

In the end of Qing Dynasty, old-style private schools were on the rise. Several private schools were established, of which sites can still be seen today. In the meantime, students were taught in one single classroom by one teacher Confucian classics like “三字经” (Three-character Scripture) and “千字文” (Articles of Thousand Characters). Students in higher class were taught “四书五经” (the four books and five classics), also they were taught some mathematics prepared for commercial use.

After the ROC was founded, education of old-style private schools dominated rural areas, but it began to be challenged by new school education. According to the Village Record, the first modern school in the village Chih Cheng Primary School (至诚小学) was set up in 1928 by local gentries like Tung hsiang-yuan (董香苑). The school comprised 6 grades and 3 classes, some 100 students and 6 teachers. Contents of lessons included Chinese, arithmetic, Self-cultivation, painting, singing, exercise and so on. In 1933, the school was named after the village and in 1950 the school was turned into a public one. Although attendants increased after a series of radical educational reforms, education made little progress due to the political commotions.

Adult education began in the ROC time when villagers was helped by Sun Yat-Sen National University and it developed in Communist China by series of movements to wipe out illiteracy.

Since the 1980s, urbanizing Shipai and change of politics made genuine development of education possible. With endorsement of local leadership and villagers, Shipai Primary School was equipped with modernity and other 4 private kindergartens were built.

== Culture ==
=== Traditional suburban culture ===
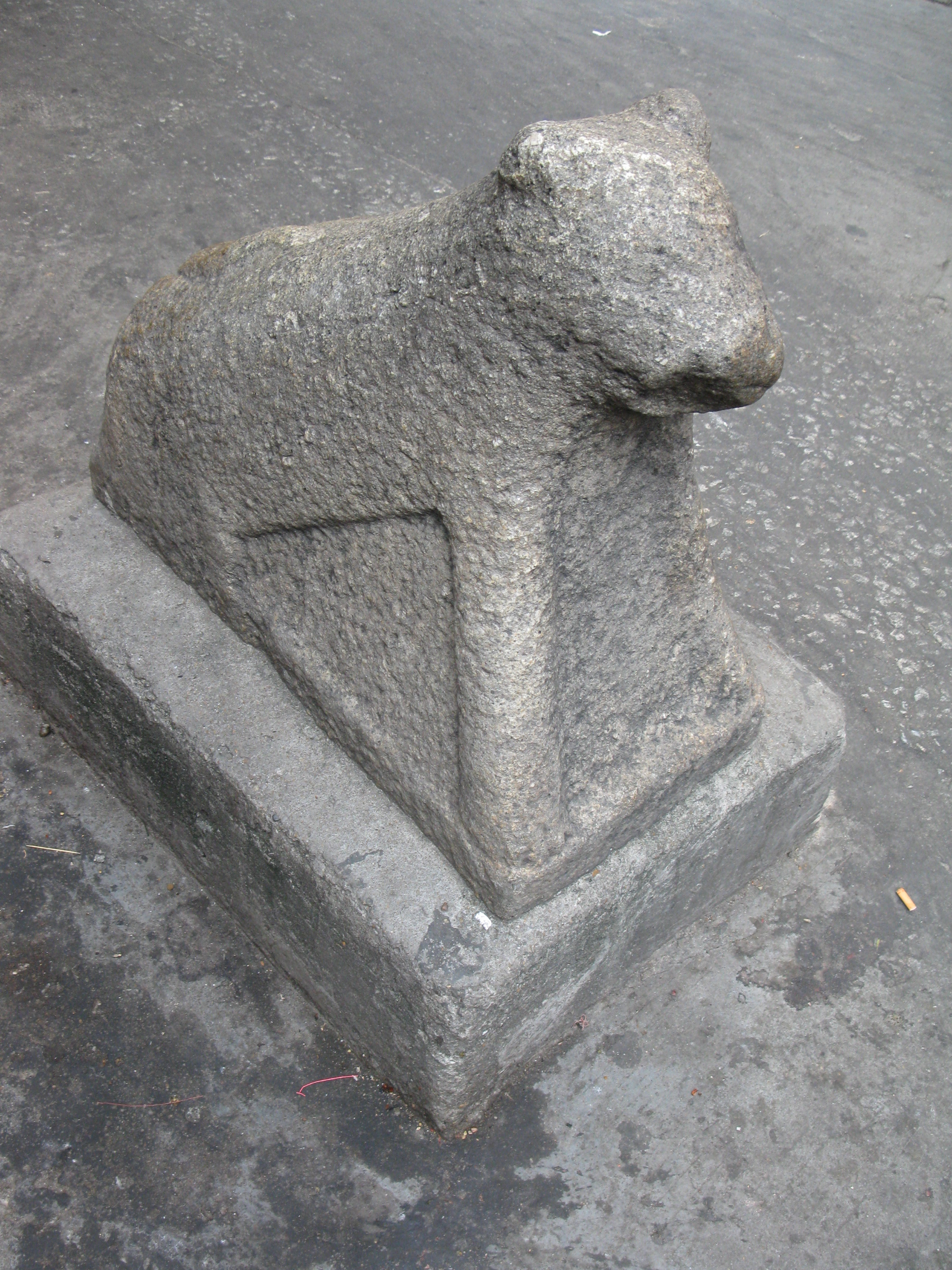
Stone hound, in 2010

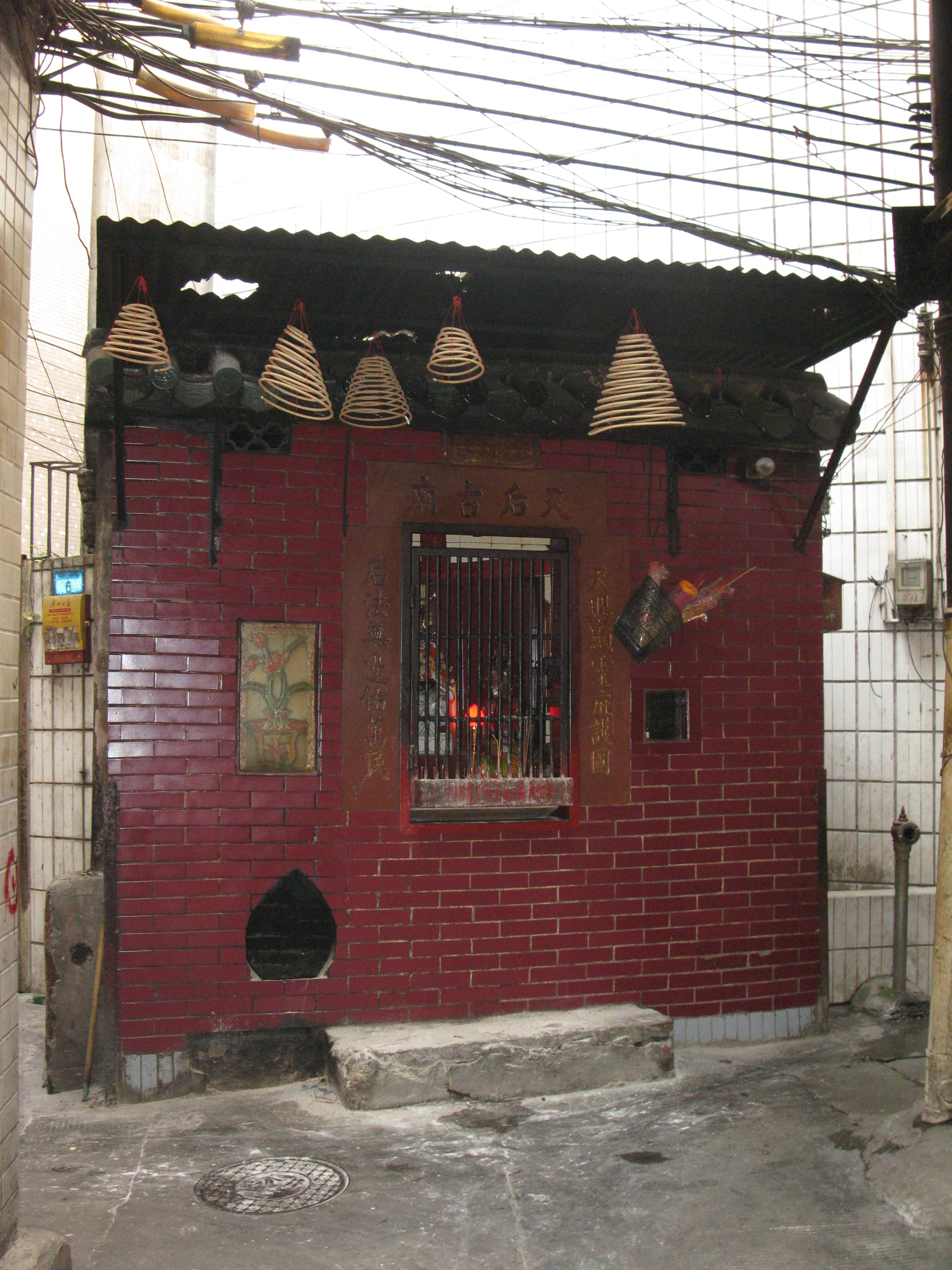
Tin Hau Temple (Niang Ma Temple), in 2010

Shipai Village, located to the east of Canton in the southern coastal area of the country, had developed a suburban folk culture that could find the shadow of philistine culture influenced by western civilization. Such kind of culture embodies itself both in its surname culture and in various carriers of culture.

Carriers of culture include substances like ancestral halls, ting, temples, relics, etc. Among them, ancestral halls and tings (places in memory of ancestors and for recreations) are of most importance. Ancestral hall is bigger in size than ting and their layouts are different. Different halls and tings belong to different surnames of clans, among which are Chi, Tung, Pan, Chen, Hsien, Liang. For these clan buildings or carriers of culture, Chi has 13 of them, Tung has11, and Pan 10.

There are other cultural relics like stone sculptures and tablets. The representatives of stone sculptures are all carved animals (turtle, lion, hound, horse), which have history of 500 years to 700 years and are regarded by villagers as treasures that can bring peace and tranquility to the village. It is alleged that the name “Shipai” was derived from these stone sculptures.

For tablets, the most famous one was the one calligraphed by Sun Yat-sen in 1924, which wrote “为国杀贼”(kill enemy for the country) on it in reward of the sacrifice villagers made during the Great Revolution. The original tablet was lost during the dark age of Cultural Revolution, the one hung up in the center of the village is an imitation. Besides, there are other 8 tablets on gates calligraphed by local gentries in Qing Dynasty: tablets of “石牌” (Shipai), ”丽庄家塾”(spectacular private school),”玉虚宫”(Yu Hsu Palace), ”朝阳”(chao yang),”瑞藻家塾”(jui tsao private school), ”匡居里”(kuang chi li), ”潘氏宗祠”(Ancestor Hall of Pan), ”善平书室”(Shan ping Library).

There were 10 temples in Shipai, of which only Yu Hsu Palace and Tin Hau Temple/Niang Ma Temple(天后古庙/娘妈庙) survive the political commotions. Worshiping in temples, once very popular among villagers, is now giving way to domestic worshiping. Despite, Niang Ma Temple attracts worshippers every day from local villagers to exotic renters, which suggests a breakthrough of polytheism beyond region.

=== Evolution of culture during urbanization ===
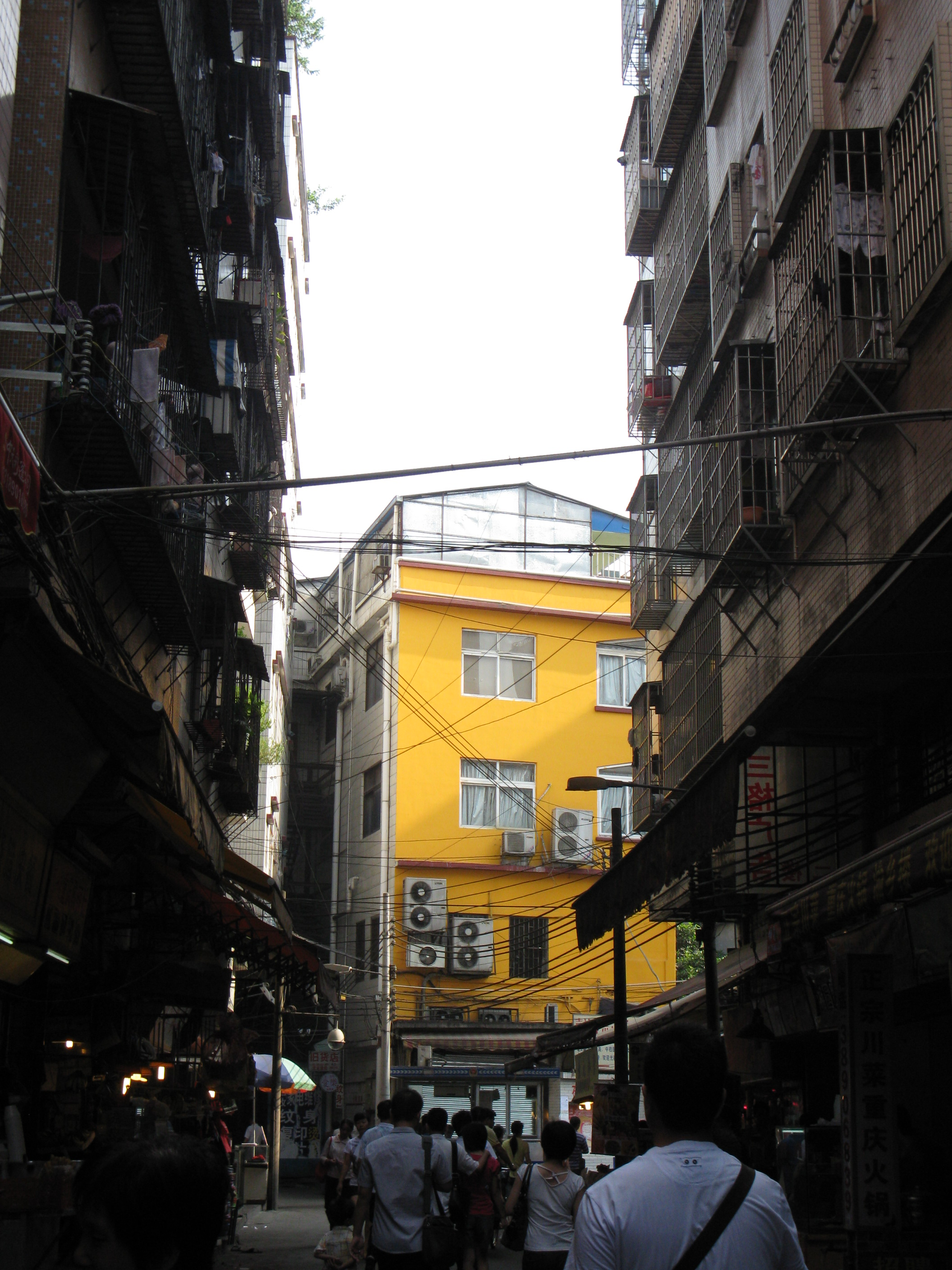
Outlet of Shipai Village, in 2010

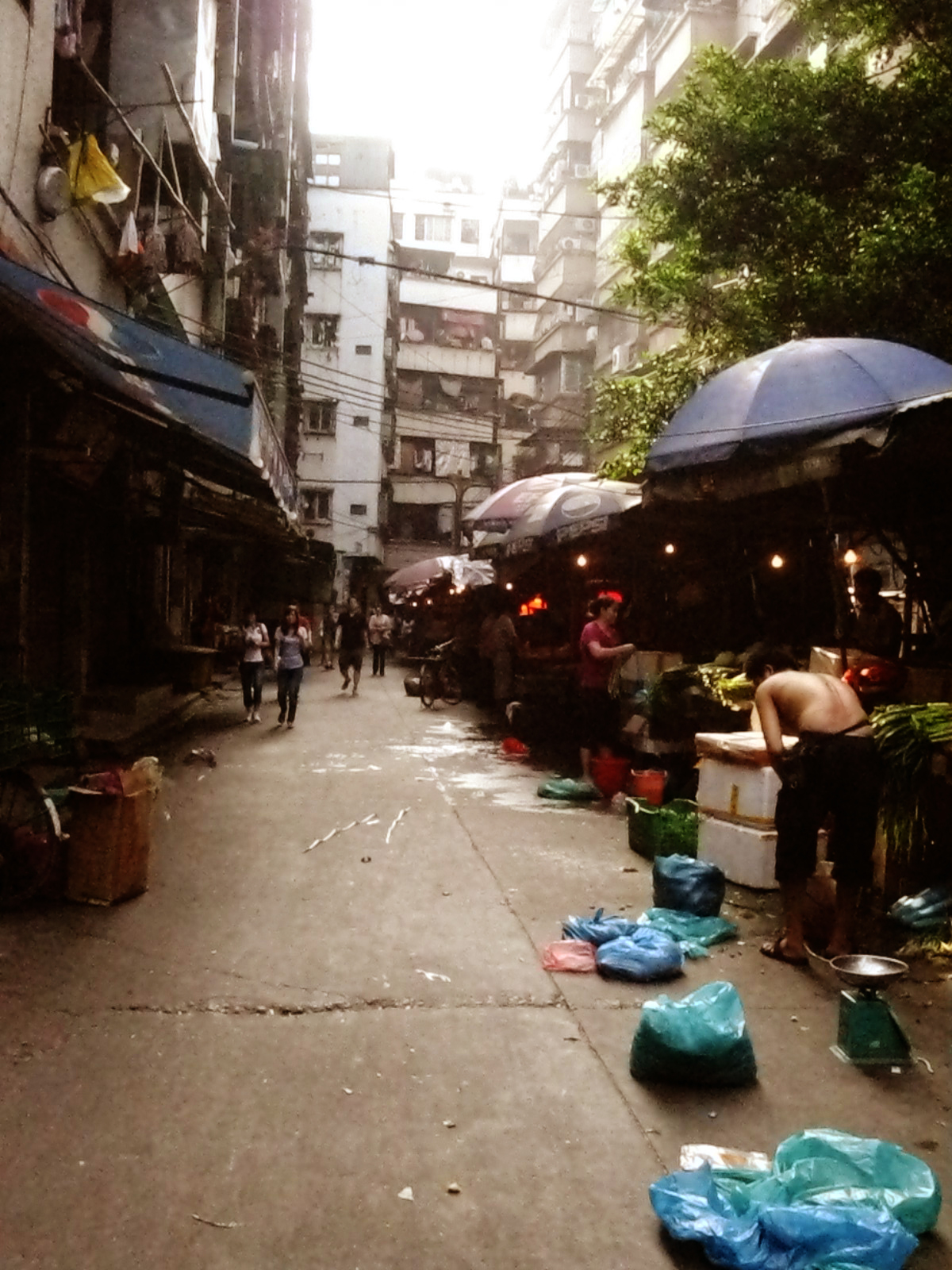
Food market, in 2010

As the village becomes urbanized, cultural environment has changed profoundly. Shipai is indeed part of the city, but it also secludes itself from the city; it embraces city culture and exotic customs and yet it stands as a rock for local traditions.

There are different people, different dialects, different living styles, as a reporter who once lived in Shipai stated: "One who’d never lived in urban villages does not truly understand Guangzhou."

For villagers, they get used to urban life on one hand, adherent to the traditional customs on the other. Especially when Chinese festivals come, annual activities will be held, such as dragon-boats race, tomb sweeping, and lion dance. But even for such traditions, those old notions related to clan dictatorship have lessened and the elements like celebration, fellowship and commerciality have deepened.

Shipai Village is also famous for its countless confusing alleys and denseness inside the village. What we call “street” or “alley” nowadays was called “li” or “fang” in the past. In the face of the 20 main streets there are gate towers carved with names of relevant streets, such as”朝阳”, “凤凰”, ”长盛”, ”迎龙”, ”龙跃”, ”笃行”, ”绿荷”, ”逢源”, ”青云”, ”河阳”, ”上谷”, ”天仁”…all bring with them a sense of poetry and auspice. At the same time, there are many modern shops available along the streets, making it a perfect pandemonium and showing the vicissitudes of the village.

== Notable people ==
Chi Pai (池柏)(1879–1961), a famous doctor, who once served as a member of Sun Yat-Sen medical team, was a local resident. Chi Yao-Ting (池耀廷)(1870–1960), who was also a doctor and a classmate of Sun Yat-Sen studied medicine at the Guangzhou Boji Hospital under the Christian missionary John G. Kerr. He was once praised by Emperor Xuantong. Chi Yu-yuan (池又元), a labor model and minister of Institute of Science and Technology of the Ministry of Railways, was born in Shipai. Tung Chao-chih (董兆致), a famous fencer who had participated in several terms of Olympics, grew up in Shipai. Ding Lei (丁磊), founder and CEO of NetEase, once lived in Shipai Village.
