= Urban village (China) =

Villages in and around large Chinese cities

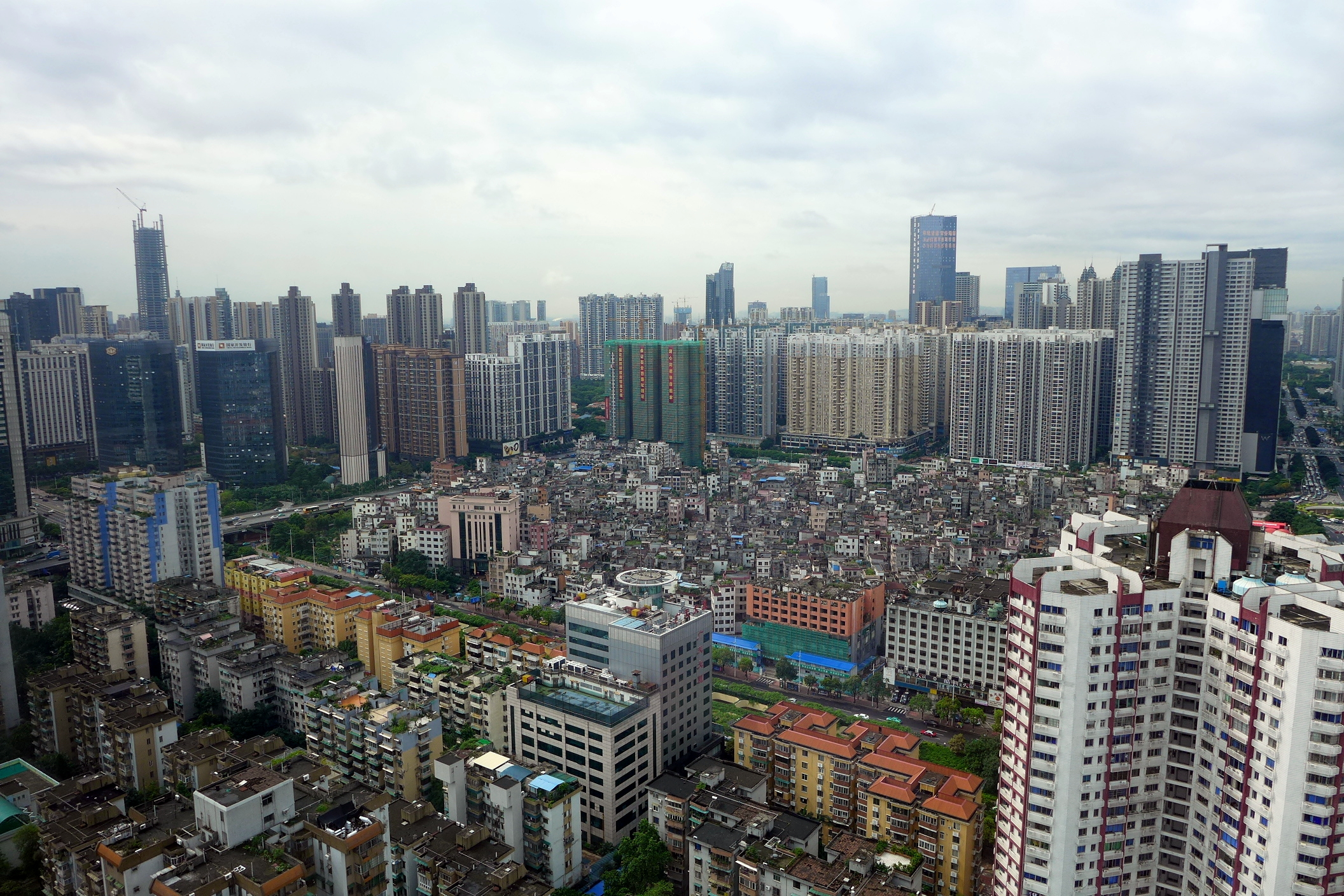
Xiancun Village of Tianhe District, Guangzhou

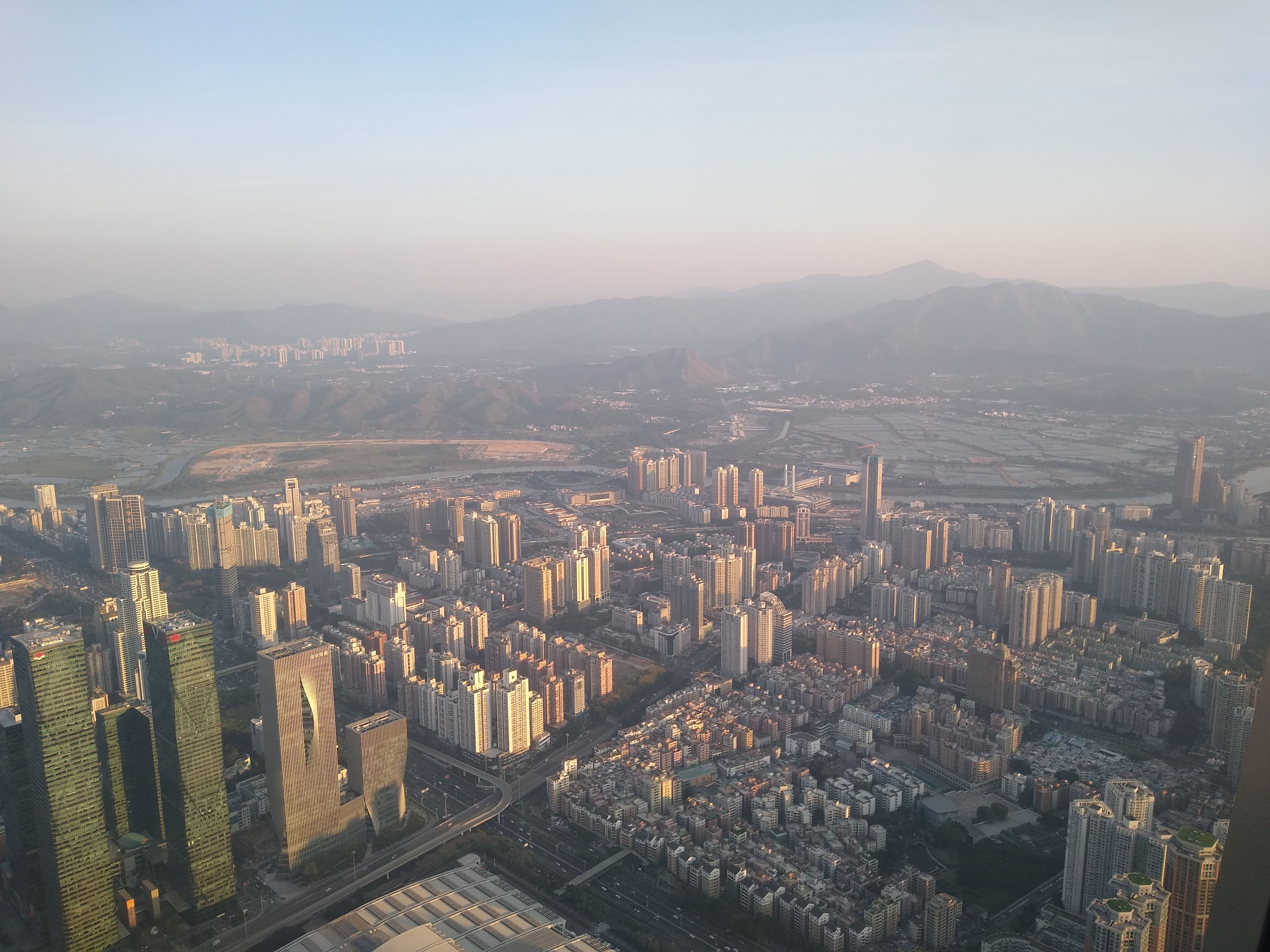
Huanggang and Shuiwei Villages (lower right) of Futian District, Shenzhen

Urban villages (Chinese: 城中村; pinyin: chéngzhōngcūn; literally: "village in city") are villages that appear on both the outskirts and the downtown segments of major Chinese cities, including Shenzhen and Guangzhou. They are surrounded by skyscrapers, transportation infrastructures, and other modern urban constructions. Urban villages are a unique phenomenon that formed part of China's urbanization efforts.

Urban villages are commonly inhabited by the poor and transient, and as such they are associated with squalor, overcrowding and social problems. However, they are also among the liveliest areas in some cities and are notable for affording economic opportunity to newcomers to the city.

== Characteristics ==
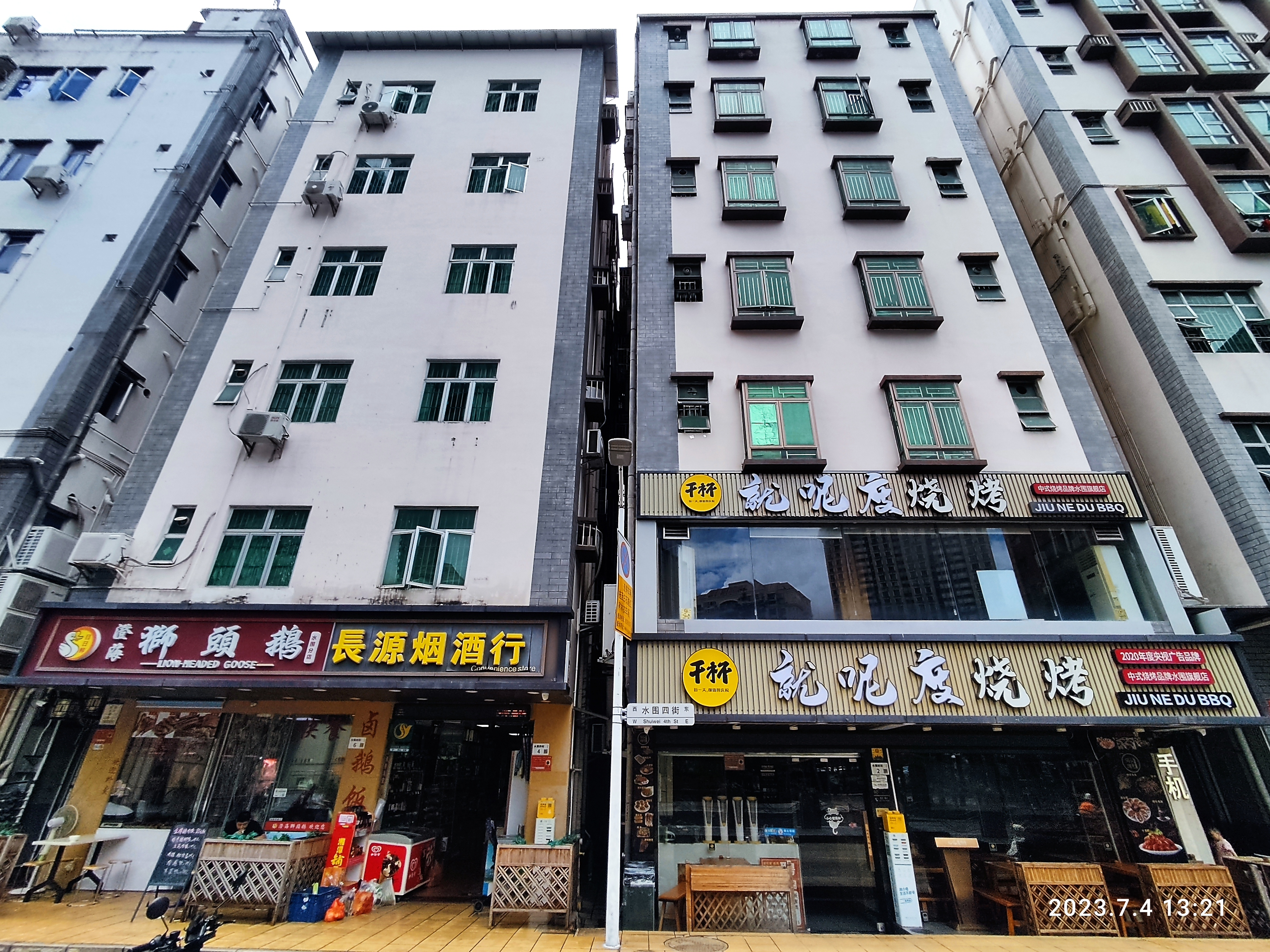
Dense multi-story buildings in Shuiwei Village, Shenzhen

Modern life in China's urban village is vastly different from the traditional agricultural way of life due to the lack of farmland. A new lifestyle has developed in which landowners build multi-story houses (which is allocated by the village collective) and rent them to the city's floating population, who are not able to afford an apartment in the better parts of the city.

Urban villages are not regulated by any form of centralized urban planning. Most of them are heavily populated, intensely developed, and lack infrastructure. Some villages' building density is greater than 70%. They are composed of crowded multi-story buildings ranging from three to five (or more) floors, and narrow alleys, which are difficult for vehicles to pass through. Inside villages, it can be dark and damp year round and lighting may have to be kept on even during daylight hours. However, many villages have designated areas at their core which house cultural facilities and examples of historic architecture, while others have special shopping and market streets, sometimes reserved for pedestrians.

On one hand, the villages provide cheap accommodation for impoverished workers coming from rural areas to try to make a living in the city. On the other, urban villages have become perceived as breeding grounds for social problems such as crime, drug addiction, alcoholism, and prostitution. Some consider urban villages to be a form of slum with Chinese characteristics. Whether these issues are a function of economics or spatial realities is up for debate.

Urban villages are predominantly located in the southern metropolises like Guangzhou, Shenzhen, and Xiamen.

== History ==
The emergence of the urban village as a unique urban phenomenon in China has its roots in the urban-rural household registration and dual land system (dual-track land ownership system), which are established and revisioned by government multiple times since 1950. The key idea of the urban-rural household registration system (hukou system) is to separate urban and rural residents and thus provide the basis for resource allocation. For urban residents, the hukou system declares stronger control over the definition and distribution of public resources, including residents' rights to receive food, clothing, education, and social welfare from the state. For rural residents, the state assumes no responsibility toward the services and thus leave a certain amount of autonomy for the local community, in the unit of a village, to organize their own resources. The urban-rural dual land system was born under the context of the hukou system and specifically addressed the usage of land between the two groups. To compensate for the insufficient state support and to restrict the amount of rural population influx into the city, the dual land system incentivized people to stay in rural villages through the right to own land. On the contrary, local governments own lands in the city and can use them freely for development purposes. This separation of land ownership significantly impacts the following development trajectory of urban villages, and in particular, shapes the housing market, demographics, and entanglement of business interests that built upon the claims to lands.

When the urbanization frontiers sprawled to the villages that used to be located on the outskirts of the city, the government compulsorily purchased some farmlands formerly cultivated by the villages and turned them into urban land, while reserving the residential lands due to the high social and economic costs to relocate the villagers. To compensate the villagers for their lost dwellings, the government had to arrange jobs and larger apartments in the city for these unskilled villagers, which was usually difficult to achieve during the early period of reform and opening up.

As urban areas expanded into villages, rural residents sold their farmland which was put to urban development purposes, with the villagers retaining small parcels for housing. Some villagers responded to rapidly increasing real estate values by building multi-unit structures on the small parcels and renting units out to people like migrants, recent college graduates, and small businesses. This practice is both illegal and pervasive.

This pattern of urbanization created informal urban settlements that are both extremely dense and have a strong sense of community. Combined with the convenient location to access job opportunities in the city and cheap rental price per person, urban villages become hubs for the low-income transient population, including rural migrant workers, poor college students, and blue-collar professionals. Such complex composition of demography and the heightened demand for affordable housing in the city restrain authorities from any plans to rapidly remove urban villages, fearing possible negative social effects and instability.

Urban villages are largely seen by authorities and urban planners as eyesores and aberrations. This perception has led to widespread instances of demolition during the 1990s and 2000s. Although the villagers typically received substantial compensation, their tenants typically received neither compensation nor relocation assistance.

A later countertrend in urban planning in China acknowledges that urban villages have positive contributions through their vibrant, mixed-use, and pedestrian friendly environments. As of 2025, a growing trend also views urban villages positively for creating affordable housing for the working class and as entry points in housing for young professionals seeking to live in gentrifying city centers.

== Stakeholders in redevelopment ==
The reason that urban villages are able to maintain their place in the city today is due to their contentious redevelopment plans among a multitude of stakeholders, among them the core ones include local government, urban village landowners, urban village residents, and real estate developers. Each of the parties has one-sided or mixed interests in removing or preserving urban villages given the offerings from other parties. Therefore, to successfully remove or regenerate urban villages is to figure out how to create win-win situations for all stakeholders.

=== Urban village land owners ===
In the process of redevelopment, urban village landowners want to bargain for compensations or new housing with improved living environments, lands, and sometimes even bonus from the appreciation of land values after the removal. Though Village collective (村集体) can represent all villagers to bargain with government and decide on the final deal, the majority of individual households that own land need to sign redevelopment contracts for removal to complete. The varying degree of regulation from the local governments and the large profits at stake for developers had led to instances of forceful and violent eviction in the past, targeting "nail households" (钉子户) that disagree with the compensation or refuse to move from their ancestral land.

=== Local governments ===
The local government is interested in maximizing the land value in the city, benefiting from the land appreciation, improving the modern image of the city, accumulating wealth and space for future city expansions. It is also the main coordinator that negotiate interests among different stakeholders, establish a framework for fair compensation, and set criteria for redevelopment. Ever since the state council (国务院) issued a document in 2013 that called for stronger government interventions and regulations in urban villages and urban slums transformation, local governments tend to play a larger role in regulating the housing market, but the extent of effectiveness can vary from place to place.

In addition, the mixed urban-rural nature of urban villages prevents government to supply public services to residents in the area effectively. The current physical structures of urban villages are often too narrow for any emergency help to reach individuals efficiently. A large number of unplanned lots surrounded by urban streets also leads to the congestion of the traffic. The living conditions in urban villages are normally bad, with poor building and infrastructure quality. Additionally, the residents living in urban villages are faced with limited public resources, such as the lack of sports facilities and green space.

=== Real estate developers ===
Real estate developer seeks profits in redevelopment, good collaboration with local government, and a socially responsible branding image. With the expansion of the city frontier, urban villages have increasingly occupied the central part of the cities that and become especially profitable when other chances of development are exhausted. For the developers, the speed and the cost to secure the land are the major concerns, which may lead to clashing interests with the urban village landowners.

=== Urban village rental residents ===
Urban village rental residents are the least powerful stakeholders among all and have been constantly silenced in the process of redevelopment. Most of them rent houses from local urban villagers who own lands and thus have little leverage to protect their rights of residence in the process of redevelopment. Urban villages provide a good sense of "home" for urban immigrants and rural laborers and also create harmonious neighborhoods. Meanwhile, rents within urban villages are usually more affordable, offering a more vivid first-level commercial, and mixed-use space for urban life. Without resolving the shortage of affordable housing in the city, this population will just move to the city peripheral and drive the rises of new urban villages in the future. The request of this group is to be included in the conversation of redevelopment and offered other options to stay in the city.

== Demolition or regeneration ==
The default approach to redeveloping the urban villages is to demolish the original structures and impose a new urban proposal on top of a blank space. This approach treats urban village as a negative or unnecessary emblem of the historical past of the city and reinforces the social stigma of the area. However, a few cities, such as Shenzhen in 2018, started to implement a softer approach to redevelopment that intentionally preserves a certain percentage of urban villages from real estate development to ensure the supply for affordable housing in the city. The evolution of word choices to address urban villages—from removal to regenerate—is the evidence toward the evolving relationship between the governments and the urban villages to work toward a mutually benefiting goal. The Bi-City Biennale of Urbanism/Architecture exhibition hosted in Shenzhen March 2018 also proposed a new lexicon to describe the relationship between the city and urban villages as "symbiosis".

== Baishizhou ==
The urban development process as well as various changes in government decisions can be read from the evolution of different urban villages in China. Take Baishizhou, the biggest urban village in Shenzhen, for instance. Located in the city center, the 0.6 square kilometer of land in Baishizhou, contains 2527 buildings, which consist of about 50473 rental rooms. Based on a rough calculation, at least 3 million people have lived in Baishizhou since 1990. As a highly developed urban village, Baishizhou has finished its process of turning farmland into residential enclaves, becoming embedded in the high dense urban fabric, with few reflecting its original agricultural remaining. Since 2005, the government has decided to renew specific areas of Baishizhou, which consistently makes the immigrants living in the village worry about their continuous stay in the city. However, the planning bureau of Shenzhen finally launched an urban regeneration proposal in June 2017, indicating a new era of development in Baishizhou.

== See also ==
- Desakota
- Village (China)
- Urban Planning Society of China
- Urban density
- Shipai Village, one of the biggest urban villages in Guangzhou
