= Baishizhou station =

Metro station in Shenzhen, Guangdong, China

Coordinates: 22°32′22″N 113°58′3″E

Baishizhou 白石洲
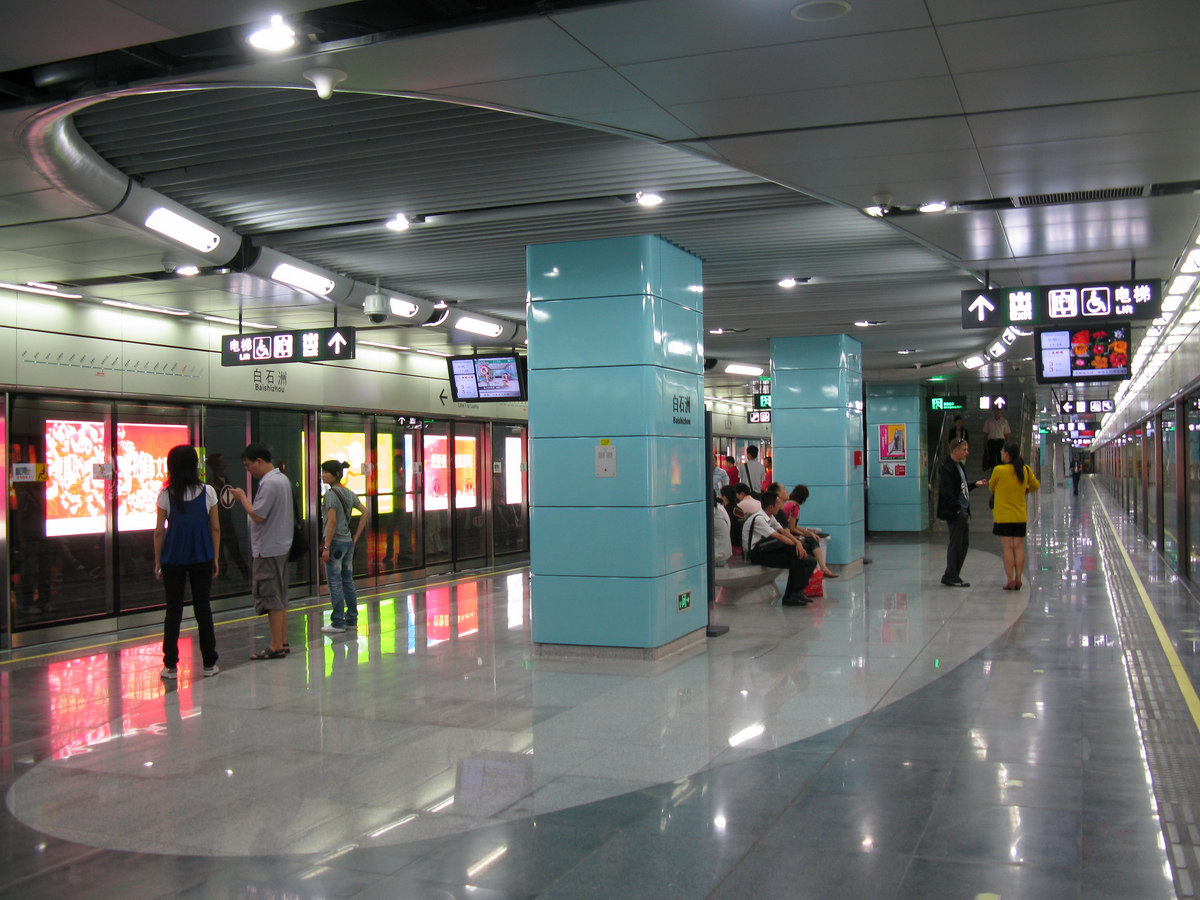

Chinese name
- Chinese: 白石洲
Transcriptions
Standard Mandarin
- Hanyu Pinyin: Báishízhōu
Yue: Cantonese
- Jyutping: Baak6 Sek6 Zau1

General information
- Location: Baishizhou, Nanshan District, Shenzhen, Guangdong; China
- Operated by: SZMC (Shenzhen Metro Group)
- Lines: Line 1 Line 20 (under planning)
- Platforms: 2 (1 island platform)
- Tracks: 2

Construction
- Structure type: Underground
- Accessible: Yes

History
- Opened: 28 September 2009; 16 years ago

Services
| Preceding station | Shenzhen Metro | Following station |
|---|---|---|
| Hi-Tech Park towards Airport East | Line 1 | Window of the World towards Luohu |
Route map
Location

Baishizhou station (Chinese: 白石洲站; pinyin: Báishízhōu Zhàn; Jyutping: Baak6 Sek6 Zau1 Zaam6) is a station of Line 1 and Line 20 (Phase 2, under planning) of Shenzhen Metro. It opened on 28 September 2009. It is located at the underground of the intersections of Shennan Dadao (Chinese: 深南大道) and Shahe Road (Chinese: 沙河路), in Baishizhou, Nanshan District, Shenzhen, China.

== Station layout ==
| G | - | Exit |
| B1F; Concourse | Lobby | Customer Service, Shops, Vending machines, ATMs |
| B2F; Platforms | Platform 1 | ← Line 1 towards Airport East (Hi-Tech Park) |
| B2F; Platforms | Island platform, doors will open on the left |
| B2F; Platforms | Platform 2 | Line 1 towards Luohu (Window of the World) → |

== Exits ==
| Exit | Destination |
|---|---|
| Exit A | Shennan Boulevard (N), Shahe Street, Xiabaishicun / Xiasha Village, Shahe Primary School, Shenzhen Shahe Hospital, Baishizhou Passenger Service Point of Nanshan Inter-city Bus Station |
| Exit B | Shennan Boulevard (N), Shahe East Road |
| Exit C | Shennan Boulevard (S), Shahe East Road, Shenzhen Nanshan Bilingual School |
| Exit D | Shennan Boulevard (S), Shahe Rainbow Department Store, Kingkey Banner Center, Shizhou Middle Road, Bonny Space of Building Materials and Furniture |
