= Hi-Tech Park station =

Metro station in Shenzhen, Guangdong, China

Coordinates: 22.540216°N 113.953961°E

Hi-Tech Park 高新园
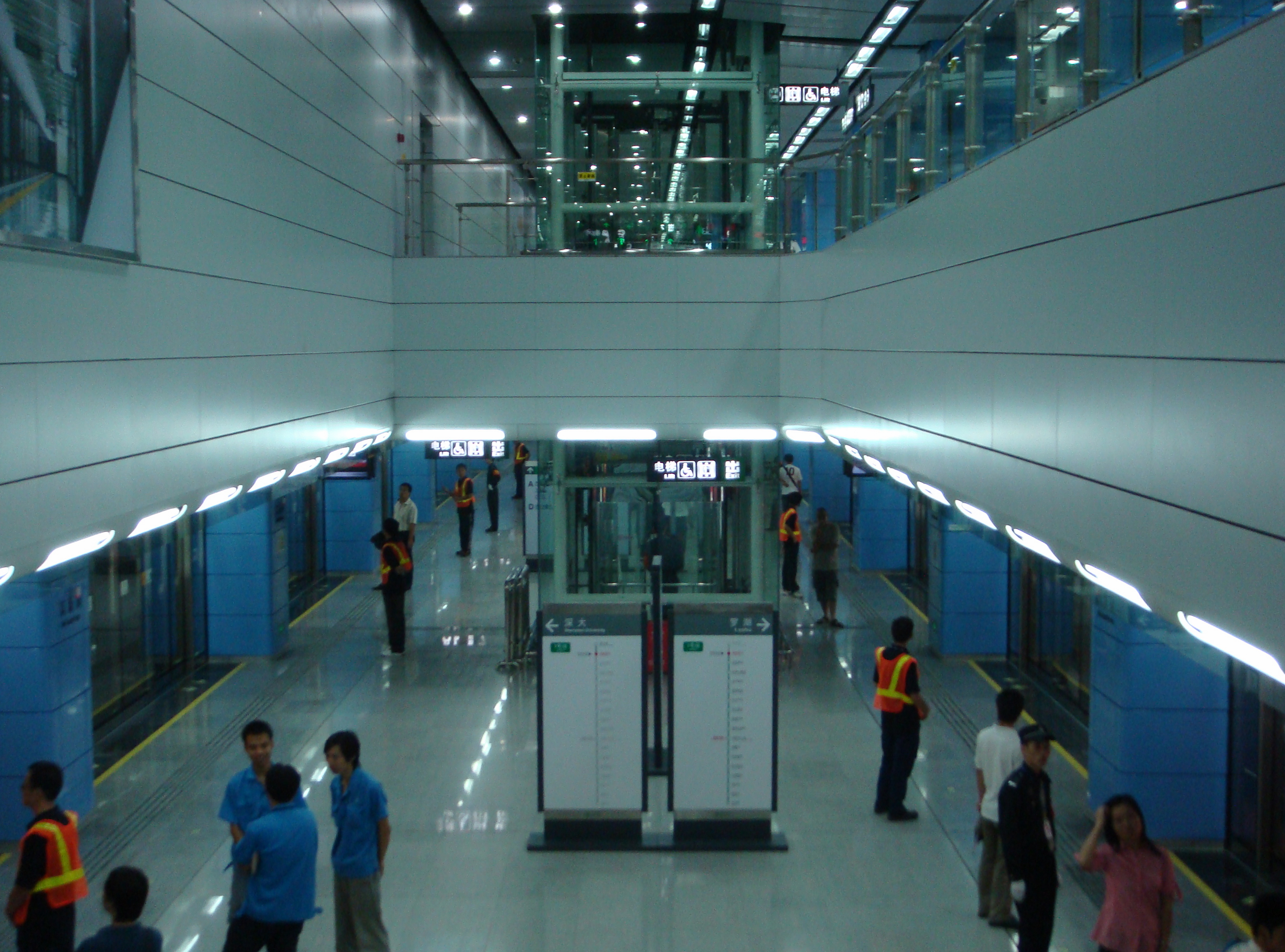

Chinese name
- Traditional Chinese: 高新園
- Simplified Chinese: 高新园
Transcriptions
Standard Mandarin
- Hanyu Pinyin: Gāo Xīn Yuán
Yue: Cantonese
- Jyutping: Gou1 San1 Jyun4

General information
- Location: Nanshan District, Shenzhen, Guangdong; China
- Operated by: SZMC (Shenzhen Metro Group)
- Line: Line 1
- Platforms: 2 (1 island platform)
- Tracks: 2

Construction
- Structure type: Underground
- Accessible: Yes

History
- Opened: 28 September 2009; 16 years ago
- Previous names: Gaoxinyuan

Services
Preceding station	Shenzhen Metro	Following station
Shenzhen University towards Airport East	Line 1	Baishizhou towards Luohu
Route map
Location

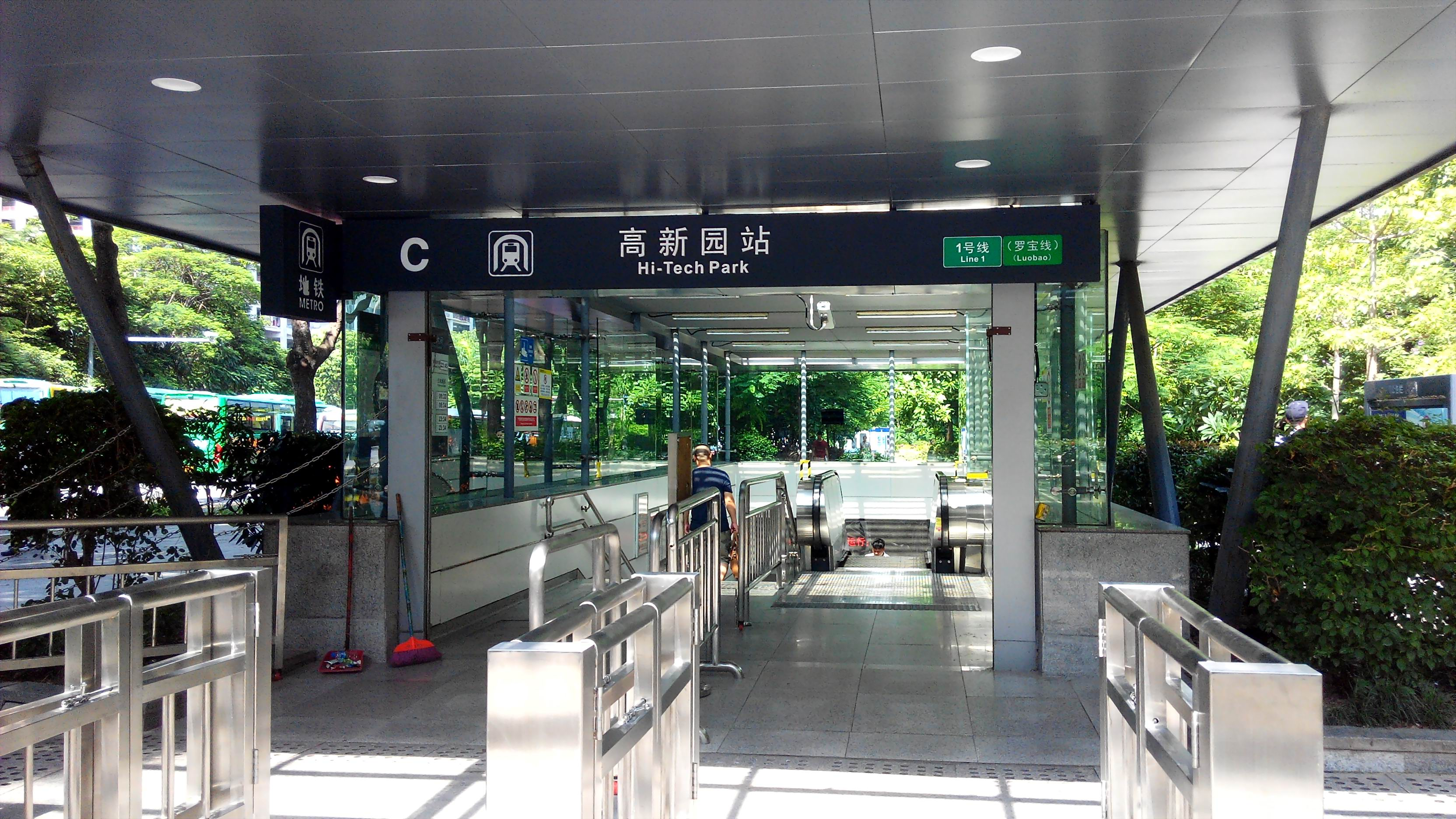
Exit C

Hi-Tech Park station (simplified Chinese: 高新园站; traditional Chinese: 高新園站; Jyutping: Gou1 San1 Jyun4 Zaam6), formerly Gaoxinyuan station, is a station on Line 1 of the Shenzhen Metro. It started operations on 28 September 2009. It is located underground at the intersection of Shennan Dadao (Chinese: 深南大道), Tonggu Road (simplified Chinese: 铜鼓路; traditional Chinese: 銅鼓路) and Kejinan Shilu (Chinese: 科技南十路), in the Nanshan District of Shenzhen, China. The station is named after the Shenzhen Hi-Tech Park (simplified Chinese: 深圳高新技术园; traditional Chinese: 深圳高新技術園), but the name has been criticized as inappropriate since it is actually closer to Dachong (simplified Chinese: 大冲; traditional Chinese: 大涌).

== Station layout ==
G	-	Exit
B1F; Concourse	Lobby	Customer Service, Shops, Vending machines, ATMs
B2F; Platforms	Platform 1	← Line 1 towards Airport East (Shenzhen University)
B2F; Platforms	Island platform, doors will open on the left
B2F; Platforms	Platform 2	Line 1 towards Luohu (Baishizhou) →

== Exits ==
Exit	Destination
Exit A	Shennan Boulevard (N), Dachong Road, Dachong Xincun, Tonggu Road
Exit B	Shennan Boulevard (N), Dachong Primary School, Shenzhen Nanshan Foreign Language School, Shenzhen Wuzhou Hospital of Integrated Chinese and Western Medicine, Bus Station (to Nanshan, Bao'an)
Exit C	Shennan Boulevard (S), TCL Building
Exit D	Shennan Boulevard (S), DESAY Technology Building, Bus Station (to Luohu, Futian)
