= Desakota =

Term used in urban geography

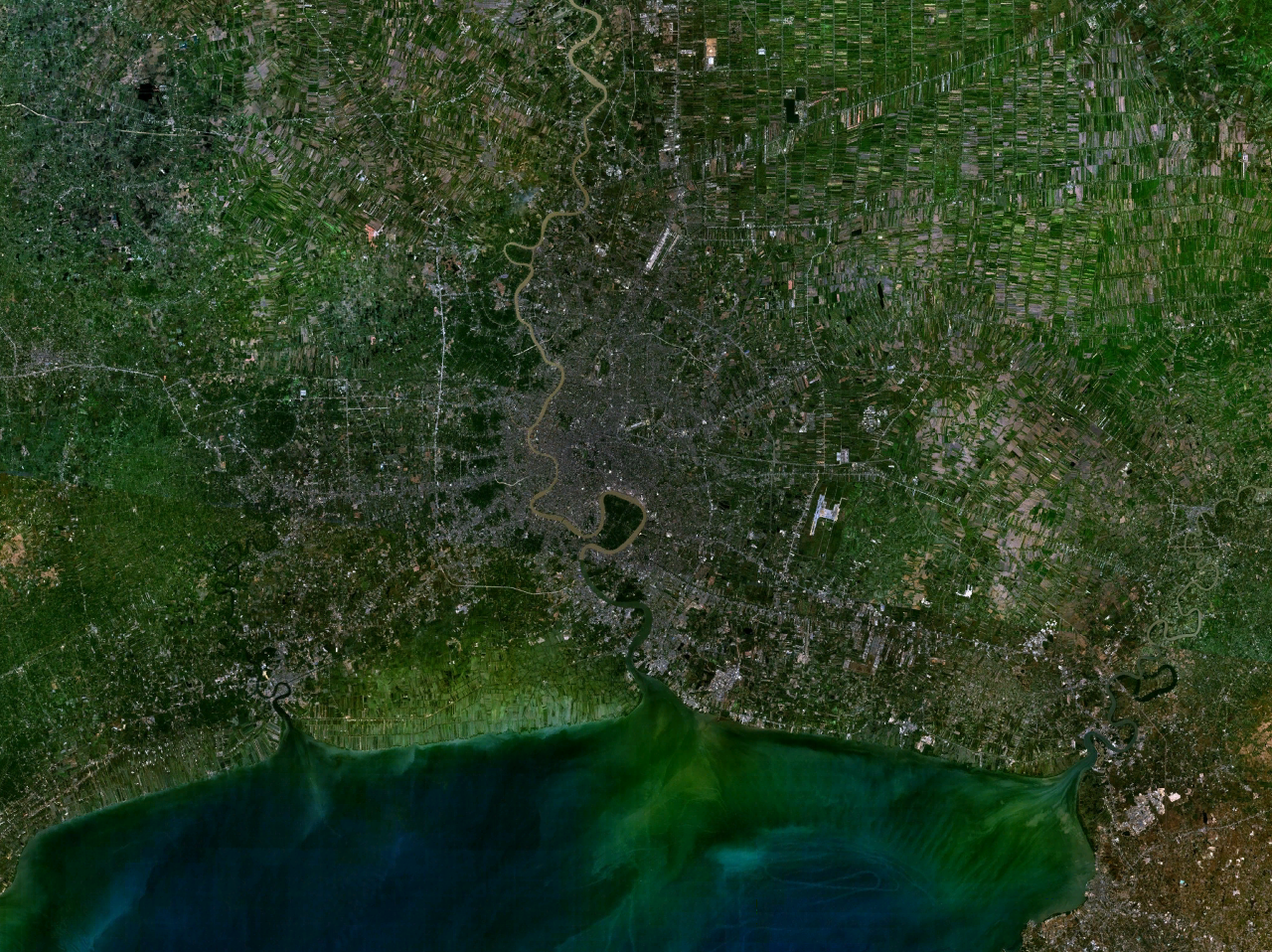
Satellite image of the Bangkok Metropolitan Region: The urbanized areas on the edges and along the arterial roads are desakota spaces.

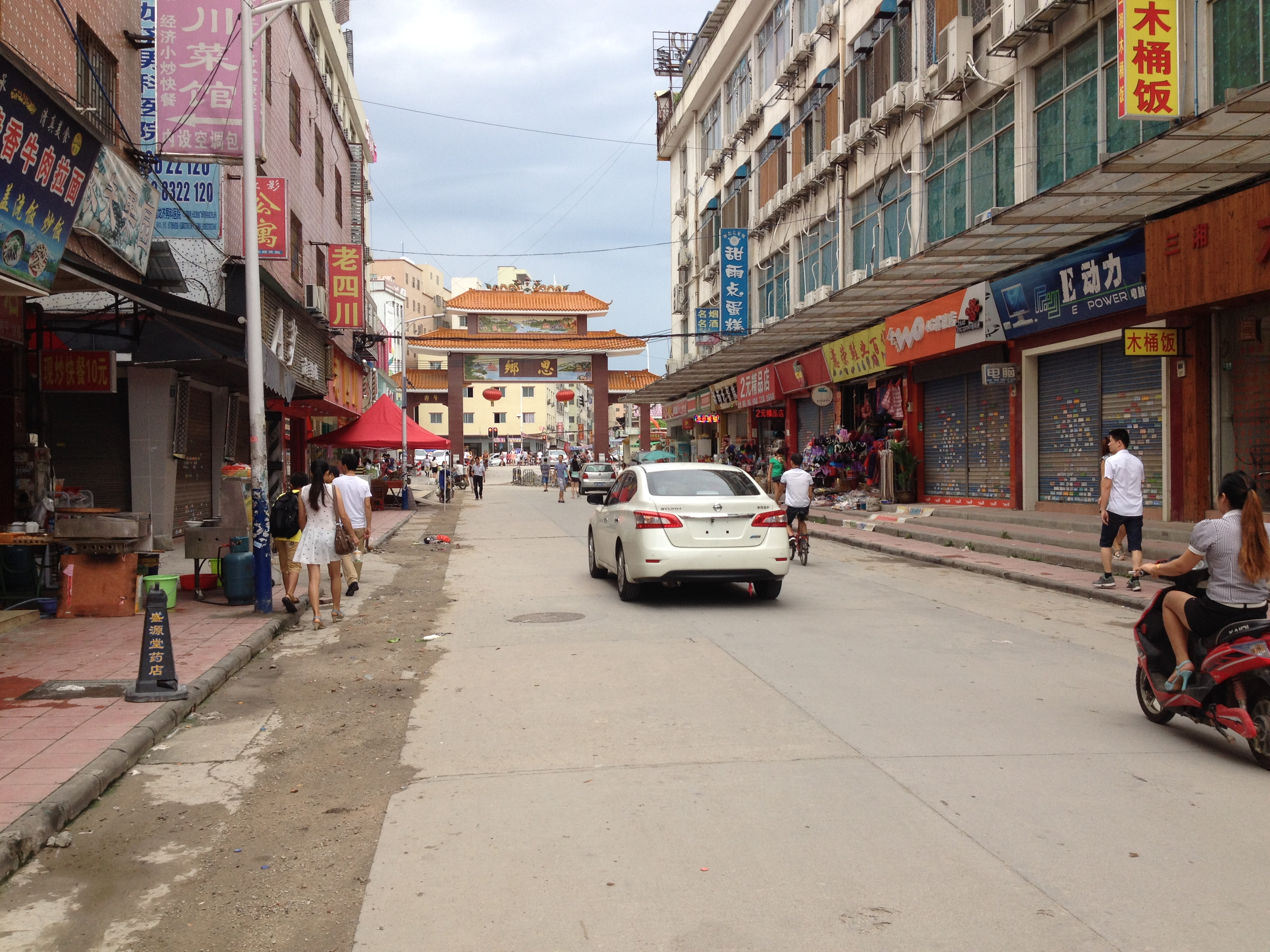
An urban fringe village located in Baiyun District, Guangzhou, China. Baiyun is well known by the locals as a desakota area in Guangzhou.

Desakota is a term used in urban geography to describe areas in the extended surroundings of large cities, in which urban and agricultural forms of land use and settlement coexist and are intensively intermingled.

== Etymology ==
The term was coined by the urban researcher Terry McGee of the University of British Columbia around 1990. It comes from Indonesian desa "village" and kota "city".

Desakota areas typically occur in Asia, especially South East Asia. Examples can be found in the urbanised regions of Java, the densely populated, delta-shaped areas on the peripheries of the Jakarta agglomeration ("Jabodetabek"), but also the extended metropolitan regions of Bangkok or Manila. Outside South East Asia, areas with comparable features have been described in mainland China, India, Nepal, Japan, Taiwan, and South Korea.

== Characteristics ==
Desakota areas are situated outside the periurban zones, from which daily commuting is easily possible, i.e. more than 30 to 50 km (19 to 31 mi) off the city centre. They often sprawl alongside arterial and communication roads, sometimes from one agglomeration to the next. They are characterised by high population density and intensive agricultural use (especially wet-rice cultivation), but differ from densely populated rural areas by more urban-like characteristics. These criteria are: developed transport networks, high population mobility, increasing activity outside the agricultural sector, the coexistence of many different forms of land use, more female participation in paid labour, and unregulated land use.

Given their rambling extent and indistinct boundaries, the emergence of Desakota regions brings difficulties for the administration, as uniform plans, regulations or designs are hardly viable. Desakota regions are characterised by high mobility of goods and services and rapid change in patterns of settlement. They usually elude the division in functionally specialised zones that is conventionally applied in urban geography. Completely different forms of use, as e.g. traditional agriculture, large scale and cottage industry, amusement parks and golf courses, shopping centres and retail parks, and forms of settlement from shanty towns to gated community coexist in them close to each other.

== See also ==
- Peri-urbanisation
- Ribbon development
- Urban sprawl
- Urban village (China)

== Literature ==
- Bunnell, Tim; Drummond, Lisa B.W.; Ho, K.C., eds. (2002). Critical Reflections on Cities in Southeast Asia. Singapore: Times Academic Press. ISBN 978-981-210-192-1.
- Guldin, Gregory Eliyu (1997). "Desakotas and Beyond: Urbanization in Southern China". Farewell to Peasant China: Rural Urbanization and Social Change in the Late Twentieth Century. Armonk NY: M. E. Sharpe. p. 47. ISBN 9781315293455.
- Hebbert, Michael (1994). "Sen-biki amidst Desakota: Urban Sprawl and Urban Planning in Japan". Planning for Cities and Regions in Japan. Liverpool: Liverpool University Press. pp. 70–91.
- McGee, Terry G. (1991). "The Emergence of Desakota Regions in Asia: Expanding a Hypothesis". The Extended Metropolis: Settlement Transition Is Asia. Honolulu: University of Hawaii Press. pp. 3–25. ISBN 978-0-8248-1297-3.
- McGee, T.G. (2009), The Spatiality of Urbanization: The Policy Challenges of Mega-Urban and Desakota Regions of Southeast Asia (PDF), UNU-IAS Working Paper, United Nations University Institute of Advanced Studies, archived from the original (PDF) on 2014-05-02
- Pelling, Mark; Mustafa, Daanish (2010), Vulnerability, Disasters and Poverty in Desakota Systems (PDF), Environment, Politics and Development Working Paper, Department of Geography, King’s College London, S2CID 131377315, archived from the original (PDF) on 2014-05-02
