= 2026 in rail transport =

This article lists events related to rail transport that are currently scheduled to occur in 2026. Please be aware that the actual dates on which these events occur may differ substantially from what is shown here.

== Events ==
=== January ===
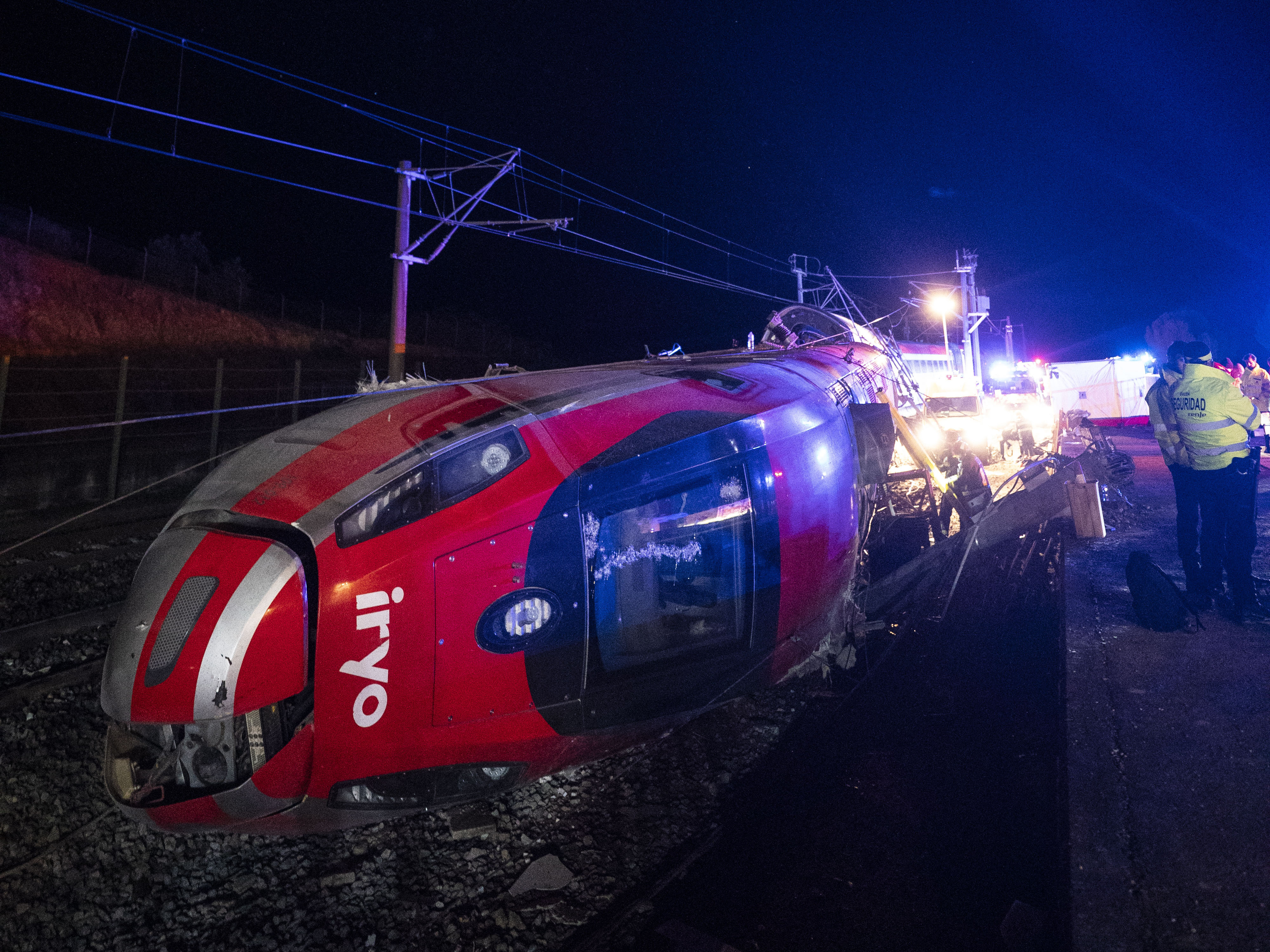
One of the trains involved in the Adamuz train derailments in Spain (18 January)

- (United States) 4 January – The Northstar Line in Minneapolis ends service.
- (Estonia) 5 January – Tallinn–Tapa railway is electrified.
- (France) 7 January – Line T3 of the Marseille tramway network extends to the north to Capitaine Gèze from Arenc - le silo.
- (France) 10 January – Line T3 of the Marseille tramway network extends to the south to La Gaye from Castellane.
- (India) 11 January – Yellow Line of Ahmedabad Metro extends to Mahatma Mandir from Sachivalaya.
- 12 January
  - (Azerbaijan) – New interregional train is launched between Ganja and Qabala.
  - (Estonia) (Latvia) – A direct train is launched between Tartu and Riga.
  - (Canada) – The Mascouche line of Exo commuter rail reroutes to Côte-de-Liesse from Central Station.
- 14 January – Sikhio train disaster: A crane collapses onto a passenger train in Sikhio district, Nakhon Ratchasima province, Thailand, killing at least 32 and injuring at least 67 others.
- (China) 16 January – Line 6 of the Ningbo Rail Transit opens between Gulin and Honglian.
- 18 January
  - (China) – Line Z4 of the Tianjin Metro opens between Zhaishang and Beitang.
  - – 2026 Adamuz train derailments: A high-speed train derails and crashes into another in southern Spain, killing 46 people.
- (Spain) 20 January – 2026 Gelida train derailment: A retaining wall collapses on a Rodalies de Catalunya train near Gelida, killing a trainee driver and injuring 37 people.
- (France) 21 January – The Outre-Furan station opens on Line T3 of the Saint-Étienne tramway.
- (India) 22 January – Kamakhya–Howrah Vande Bharat Sleeper Express is launched.
- (Italy) 23 January – The rail connection between Malpensa Aeroporto Terminal 2 and Gallarate opens.
- (Australia) 26 January – Glenelg tram line in Adelaide reopens between Glenelg and South Terrace following completion of grade separation work.
- 28 January
  - (China) – Guangzhou–Qingyuan intercity railway extends from Huadu to Guangzhou Baiyun.
  - (Indonesia) – Jatake Station opens on the Rangkasbitung Line.
- (United Kingdom) 29 January – Sale of Freightliner's intermodal container business to CMA CGM completed, residual heavy haul business rebranded as Heavy Haul Rail.
- (United Kingdom) 31 January – Great Western Railway introduces Britain's first modern battery electric multiple unit into passenger service on the Greenford branch line.

=== February ===
- 1 February
  - (Algeria) – SNTF launches passenger trains between Béchar and Tindouf.
  - (Germany) – Hermann-Hesse-Bahn opens between Calw and Weil der Stadt.
  - (Serbia) – Line 8 of the Belgrade tram network opens from Banjica to Omladinski stadion.
- (Mexico) 2 February – El Insurgente extends to Observatorio from Santa Fe.
- (France) 4 February – The new Boirargues station opens on Line 3 of the Montpellier tramway network, and the old one is renamed to Soriech.
- (Canada) 8 February – Line 5 Eglinton of the Toronto subway opens between Mount Dennis and Kennedy.
- 9 February
  - (Brazil) – Belo Horizonte Metro Line 1 extends from Eldorado to Novo Eldorado.
  - (Brazil) – Fortaleza Metro Line 5 opens between Expedicionários and Aeroporto.
- (China) 10 February – Line 4 of the Chongqing Rail Transit extends to Shimahelijiao from Min'an Ave.
- 14 February
  - (China) – Jinhua–Jiande high-speed railway opens between Jiande railway station and Lanxi East railway station.
  - (France) – Line B of the Brest Tramway Network opens between Brest station and Hôpital de la Cavale Blanche.
  - (France) – Line T6 of the Lyon Tramway Network extends to La Doua-Gaston Berger from Hopitaux Est.
- (Brazil) 21 February – GRU Airport People Mover opens in São Paulo/Guarulhos International Airport.
- 22 February
  - (India) – Delhi–Meerut RRTS extends from New Ashok Nagar to Sarai Kale Khan.
  - (India) – Meerut Metro opens between Meerut South and Modipuram.
- (Dominican Republic) 24 February – Line 2 of the Santo Domingo Metro extends to Pablo Adón Guzmán from María Montez.
- (Germany) 28 February – Line 14 of Munich Tramway opens between Munich-Pasing and Ammerseestraße.

=== March ===
- 1 March
  - (Austria) – Westbahn starts passenger operations between Wien Hauptbahnhof and Villach alongside the introduction of new Stadler Smile trainsets.
  - (Poland) – Leo Express extends Prague-Kraków service to Warsaw.
- 8 March
  - (India) – Pink Line of Delhi Metro extends to Maujpur - Babarpur from Majlis Park, making a complete loop.
  - (India) – Magenta Line of Delhi Metro opens between Deepali Chowk and Majlis Park.
- 12 March
  - (China) (North Korea) – Passenger services resume between Beijing and Pyongyang.
- (India) 14 March – The Chennai MRTS extends to St. Thomas Mount from Velachery.
- (United States) 16 March – The first track of the Portal North Bridge opens.
- (Netherlands) (Germany) 19 March – GoVolta starts passenger operations between Amsterdam and Berlin, and Amsterdam and Hamburg the following day, the latter being eventually axed just 3 months later.
- (France) (Belgium) (Germany) 26 March – European Sleeper begins a night train service between Paris, Brussels, and Berlin.
- (Uzbekistan) 27 March – Uzbek Railways launches Afrosiyob train from Tashkent to Shahrisabz.
- (United States) 28 March – 2 Line of Link light rail extends to Lynnwood City Center from South Bellevue.
- 31 March
  - (Brazil) – Line 17 of the São Paulo Metro opens between São Paulo–Morumbi, Aeroporto de Congonhas and Washington Luís.
  - (United States) – DC Streetcar ends service.
  - (United States) – Monon Corridor of the South Shore Line opens between Hammond Gateway and Munster/Dyer.

=== April ===
- (Japan) 1 April – Rumoi Main Line between Ishikari-Numata and Fukagawa closes.
- (United Kingdom) 5 April – The Birmingham Eastside extension of the West Midlands Metro opens between Bull Street/Corporation Street and Millennium Point.
- (United Kingdom) 7 April – Local passenger service resumes on Birmingham's Camp Hill line after it was discontinued in 1946.
- (India) 8 April – Mumbai Metro: Line 2B opens between Diamond Garden and Mandale; Line 9 opens between Kashigaon and Dahisar East.
- (Russia) 9 April – Line T2 of Moscow tramway network opens between Chertanovskaya metro station and Novogireevo railway station, thus lines 3 and 37 end operations.
- (Sweden) (Norway) 13 April – The Swedish Government halves long-distance train traffic in Norrbotten and Lapland, and discontinues night train service between Boden and Narvik.
- (Czech Republic) 18 April – Lines 20 and 21 of the Prague tramway network are rerouted to Dvorecký Bridge.
- (United States) 21 April – The Rockies to the Red Rocks, which was previously Rocky Mountaineer's Denver–Moab route, transitions to a new operator, Canyon Spirit, under the same parent company, which extends the line to Salt Lake City on the same day.
- (China) 22 April – Line S2 of the Nanjing Metro opens between Xishanqiao station and Taibai station.
- 26 April
  - (China) – Jinyidong line of the Jinhua Rail Transit extends from Lingyun station to Yiwu railway station.
  - (Mexico) – The Felipe Ángeles opens between Buenavista and AIFA–Clara Krause.
- 27 April
  - (Uzbekistan) – Electric train is launched between Kokand and Margilan.
  - (Indonesia) – Two trains collide in Bekasi, killing 16 people and injuring 91 more.
- (Czech Republic) (Slovakia) 30 April – Leo Express is launched between Prague and Bratislava.

=== May ===
- 1 May
  - (China) – Line 12 of the Wuhan Metro opens between Moshuihu Park and Gangduhuayuan.
  - (Czech Republic) (Germany) (Denmark) – A direct Railjet train is introduced between Prague, Berlin, Hamburg and Copenhagen, using ComfortJet trainsets.
- 3 May
  - (Uzbekistan) – Uzbek Railways launches high-speed trains between Tashkent and Khiva.
  - (United Kingdom) – First Rail London succeeds Arriva Rail London as operator of the London Overground.
- (Sweden) (Denmark) (Germany) 4 May – A direct daytime Snälltåget train is introduced between Stockholm, Copenhagen and Hamburg.
- (Egypt) 6 May – East Nile Line of the Cairo Monorail opens between Moushir Tantawi station and Justice City.
- (United States) 8 May – D Line of Los Angeles Metro Rail extends to Wilshire/La Cienega from Wilshire/Western.
- (Kazakhstan) 16 May – Astana Light Metro opens between Nursultan Nazarbayev International Airport and Astana-Nurly Zhol station.
- 18 May
  - (Canada) – Montreal REM: Anse-à-l'Orme branch opens between Anse-à-l'Orme and Bois-Franc.
  - (United States) – KC Streetcar extends to Berkeley Riverfront from River Market North.
- (Turkey) 22 May – Istanbul Metro M5 extends to Sultanbeyli from Samandıra Merkez. Sancaktepe Şehir Hastanesi opens on the same line.
- (United Kingdom) 25 May – Lumo, an open access operator, starts passenger services between London Euston and Stirling.
- (Azerbaijan) (Georgia (country)) 26 May – Passenger servises resume between Baku and Tbilisi.
- (England) 31 May – Greater Thameslink Railway succeeds Govia Thameslink Railway.

=== June ===
- (Latvia) 1 June – Rīgas Satiksme extends routes 7 and 14 of Riga tram from Shopping Center "Dole" to Višķu iela.
- (Germany) (Belgium) 6 June – Cologne–Oostende ICE high speed service commences.
- 14 June
  - (Germany) – The ICE L enters service on the route between Berlin, Hamburg and Westerland (Sylt).
  - (Poland) – Bielawa Jezioro and Bielawa Góry Sowie railway stations open.
  - (Poland) – The Śniadowo–Łomża railway reopens after its revitalisation, which includes the opening of Łomża, Konarzyce, and Koziki railway stations.
- 15 June
  - (Germany) – Line S15 of the Berlin S-Bahn opens between Berlin Hauptbahnhof and Wedding.
  - (Sweden) (Norway) – Snälltåget launches a direct train service between Malmö and Oslo.
- (Malaysia) 16 June – KTM Komuter Southern Sector opens between Kulai, Kempas Baru, Johor Bahru and Pasir Gudang.
- (China) 18 June – Line 3 of the Foshan Metro is extended between Zhongshan Park and Lianhe, connecting the line's two separate branches.
- 19 June
- (Turkey) – M11 line of the Istanbul Metro extends from Arnavutköy Hastane to Halkalı.
- (United Kingdom) – 2026 Bedford train collision: Two trains collide on the Midland Main Line near Elstow, killing one person and injuring 162.
- (Germany) (Czech Republic) (Poland) 25 June – Leo Express launches a direct train from Frankfurt am Main to Prague and Przemyśl.
- (Egypt) 27 June – East Nile Line of the Cairo Monorail extends from Moushir Tantawi station to Stadium Station.
- 28 June
  - (United Kingdom) – Cambridge South railway station opens, becoming the first station to carry Great British Railways branding.
  - (China) – Line 13 of the Shenzhen Metro is extended from Shangwu to Lisonglang, completing the northern extension of Shenzhen Metro Line 13 Phase 2.
  - (China) – The interchange passageway between Line 5 and Line 11 of the Tianjin Metro opens at Wenhuazhongxin station, allowing for an in-station interchange between three lines.
- 29 June
  - (Australia) – The Australind resumes service between Perth and Bunbury.
  - (Malaysia) – Shah Alam Line of the Klang Valley Integrated Transit System opens between Bandar Utama and Johan Setia.
- 30 June
  - (Brazil) – Line 17 of the São Paulo Metro branches off to Washington Luis from Brooklin Paulista.
  - (China) – Line 3 of the Shenyang Metro extends from Nanliguan to Fangjialan.
  - (China) – Line 5 of the Xi'an Metro extends from Yanminghu to Xi'an Dongzhan.
  - (China) – Xi'an–Shiyan high-speed railway opens between Xi'an East and Shiyan East.
  - (China) – Tongyun Men station opens on Beijing Subway Line 6.
  - (Taiwan) – Sanying line of the New Taipei Metro opens between Dingpu and Yingtao Fude.
  - (United Arab Emirates) – Etihad Rail launches passenger services between Abu Dhabi and Fujairah.

=== July ===
- 1 July
  - (China) – Line 7 of the Hefei Metro opens between Feicui Gongyuan and Sheng Wenhua He Feiyi Guan.
  - (China) – 3 infill stations between Liangxiang and Beijing West on Sub-Center line of Beijing Suburban Railway commence operation.
  - (China) – The new third generation Foshan railway station commences operation.
  - (Italy) – The Naples–Cancello line switches to a new alignment via Napoli Afragola as part of the development of the Naples-Bari high-speed / high-capacity line.
  - (Japan) – Discontinuation of the Akita Port Line (Ōu Main Line freight branch), including Akita Port Station.
- 2 July
  - (Brazil) – Line 6 of São Paulo Metro opens between João Paulo I and Perdizes.
  - (India) – Patna Metro extends from Bhootnath to Malahi Pakri.
- (Brazil) 3 July – Line 2 of Belo Horizonte Metro opens between Nova Suíça and Amazonas.
- (Canada) 6 July – Kitchener line of GO Transit extends to Stratford from Kitchener.
- 12 July – Circle Line of the Singapore MRT extends to Marina Bay from HarbourFront, making it a loop line.
- (Turkey) 17 July – AYBAN suburban rail opens between İncirliova and Köşk.
- (Spain) 18 July – The new alignment of the Topo of the Euskotren network enters operation between Herrera and Galtzaraborda, turning Altza into a through station on the main line.
- (China) 31 July – The Northern extension of the Guangzhou–Shenzhen intercity railway opens between Xintang South and Zhuliao.

=== August ===
- (Malaysia) 8 August – KTM Komuter Southern Sector extends to Paloh from Kulai.
- (Australia) 9 August – Extension of the Gold Coast G:link from Broadbeach South to Burleigh Heads.
- 10 August
  - (Finland) (Sweden) – Passenger services resume between Tornio and Haparanda.
  - (Germany) – New branch between Hauptbahnhof West and Münsterplatz enters operation in the Mainz tramway network.
- (India) 13 August – Yellow Line (Line 2B) of the Mumbai Metro extends from Diamond Garden to Chembur.
- (Bulgaria) 14 August – Line 3 of the Sofia Metro extends from Hadzhi Dimitar to General Vladimir Vazov.
- (Israel) 21 August – The Green Line of the Jerusalem Light Rail opens between Malha and HaTurim.
- (Denmark) 22 August – Greater Copenhagen Light Rail extends to Lundtofte from Rødovre Nord.
- (China) 26 August – Line 7 of the Changchun Rail Transit opens between Qiche Gongyuan and East Ring Road.
- (Greece) 27 August – Line 2 of Thessaloniki Metro opens between New Railway Station and Mikra.
- (Taiwan) 30 August – Tamsui–Xinyi line of the Taipei Metro extends to Guangci–Fengtian Temple from Xiangshan.
- (Netherlands) 31 August – Amsterdam's IJtram extends to Strandeiland.

=== September ===
- 1 September
  - (Sweden) (Denmark) (Germany) – SJ ends its EuroNight service between Stockholm and Berlin. RDC Deutschland, which was operating the train on behalf of SJ, takes over the service.
  - (South Korea) – The SRT is merged into the parent KTX high speed railway network, ending more than nine years of semi-private high-speed rail in the country.
- (Uzbekistan) 3 September – Passenger trains start running to Urgench International Airport.
- 4 September
  - (China) – Line 2 of the Changsha Metro extends to Longhuling station from West Meixi Lake.
  - (Germany) – Line U80/U81 of Düsseldorf Stadtbahn opens between Düsseldorf Flughafen Terminal and Düsseldorf Hauptbahnhof/Arena/Messe Nord.
- 5 September
  - (Austria) – Line 18 of Vienna Tramway extends to Stadion from Schlachthausgasse.
  - (Russia) – Line 17 of the Moscow Metro opens between Bulvar Generala Karbysheva and Delovoy Tsentr.
- (India) 6 September – Yellow Line of the Indore Metro extends to Radisson Square from Veerangana Jhalkari Bai Station.
- 7 September
  - (Germany) (Belgium) – Cologne-Antwerp ICE high speed service commences.
  - (Uzbekistan) – Passenger trains start running to Parkent from Tashkent.
- 9 September
  - (Belgium) (Netherlands) (Germany) (Switzerland) (Italy) – European Sleeper begins a night train service between Brussels and Milan.
  - – The Netherlands has a 24 hour public transportation strike, no domestic trains (with the exception of Airport Express) or international trains run all day.
  - (Turkey) Konya Tram extended to Şehir Hastanesi from Adliye.
- (New Zealand) 13 September – Auckland's City Rail Link opens, connecting Waitematā and Maungawhau.
- 16 September
  - (China) – Xiamen Metro: Line 4 begins trial running between Jimei Software Park North and Qianwu; Line 6 begins trial running between Jiaojiang Road and Huaqiao University.
  - (Indonesia) – South Line of the Jakarta LRT extends to Manggarai from Velodrome.
- (England) 20 September – DfT Operator's Chiltern Railways takes over the operations of Chiltern Railways from Arriva.
- 22 September
  - (China) – Line 12 of the Ningbo Rail Transit opens between Xiaoyangjiang and Damuwan.
  - (China) – Line 8 of the Qingdao Metro extends from Qingdao North Railway Station to May 4th Square.
- (Poland) 26 September – Kraków Fast Tram opens between TAURON Arena Kraków and Mistrzejowice.
- (Bosnia and Herzegovina) 27 September – The Sarajevo tramway extends from Ilidža to Hrasnica.
- 28 September
  - (China) – Beijing–Shangqiu high-speed railway opens between Shangqiu and Xiong'an.
  - (China) – Harbin–Yichun high-speed railway opens between Harbin and Yichun West.
  - (China) – Line 5 of the Changchun Rail Transit opens between Zhuoyue Dajie and Dongdaqiao.
  - (China) – Xi'an–Chongqing high-speed railway opens between Xi'an East and Ankang West.
  - (China) – Yichang–Xingshan high-speed railway opens between Yichang North and Xingshan.
  - (Senegal) – Train Express Régional Dakar extends to Blaise Diagne International Airport from Diamniadio.
  - (United States) – SacRT light rail opens Dos Rios station, an infill station on the Blue Line.
- (China) 29 September – Nanjing Metro Line 6 opens between Nanjing South railway station and Qixiashan.
- 30 September
  - (United States) (Canada) – New Airo trains are introduced on Amtrak Cascades between Eugene, Oregon and Vancouver, British Columbia.
  - (United States) – Pinehurst station opens on the Link light rail.

=== October ===
- 5 October
  - (Germany) (Netherlands) – Train service resumes on the Ihrhove–Nieuweschans railway, with two new stations in Bunde and Ihrhove.
  - (Netherlands) – Tram line 19 of The Hague tramways extends from Delft railway station to the campus of Delft University of Technology.
- (Turkey) 9 October – Çerkezköy-Kapıkule section of the Istanbul–Kapıkule railway opens.
- (India) 11 October – Chennai Metro Yellow Line opens between Poonamallee Bypass and Vadapalani.
- (United States) 15 October – SacRT light rail opens 7th & Railyards station, an infill station on the Green Line.
- 17 October
  - (Switzerland) (France) – Line 17 of the Geneva Tramway Network extends to Perrier-Aubrac from Annemasse.
  - (Taiwan) – Western Trunk line switches to underground tracks around Tainan as part of the Tainan Urban District Railway Underground Project.
- (Lithuania) 22 October – LTG Link puts the first of 15 new Stadler FLIRT electric and battery-electric trains into service.
- 28 October
  - (Spain) – 2026 Toledo train collision: Two trains collide in Los Yébenes, Toledo, killing at least 68 people and injuring more than 179.
  - (China) – Nantong Rail Transit: Nantong Railway Station opens on Line 2.
- (China) 29 October – Wuhan Metro: Phase 2 of Line 12 from Shilipu to Science Park commences operation, completing the whole loop line; the Yangluo Line extends to Zhongyi Road from Houhu Boulevard.
- 30 October
  - (Australia) – Sydney Metro: M1 Metro North West & Bankstown Line extends from Sydenham to Bankstown along a route converted from Sydney Trains, after a closure of two years.
  - (China) – Chengdu Metro: Longquanyi Railway Station opens as an infill station on Line 2.
  - (China) – Chengdu Longquanyi railway station opens, with passenger train services beginning the following day.
  - (United States) – The Jacksonville Skyway ends service.

=== November ===
- 4 November
  - (India) – The Pink Line of the Pune Metro opens from Maan to District Court.
  - (Italy) – The Palermo Ring Railway of the Palermo metropolitan railway service extends from Giachery to Politeama.
- (France) 6 November – Avelia Horizon enters service as TGV Nouvelle Génération with SNCF Voyageurs.
- (Finland) 7 November – The Crown Bridges line of the Helsinki tramway network opens between Laajasalo and Hakaniemi.
- (China) 12 November – Line 15 of the Chongqing Rail Transit opens between Jingkou and Liangjiang Movie City.
- (India) 14 November – Pink Line of the Namma Metro opens between Kalena Agrahara and Tavarekere.
- (China) 15 November – Line 2 of the Ürümqi Metro opens between Nanmen and Huashanjie.
- (United States) 16 November – The second track of the Portal North Bridge on the Northeast Corridor in Hudson County, New Jersey opens, enabling the resumption of full train traffic.
- (China) 19 November – Line S1 of the Hefei Metro opens between Shengzhongyiyuan Xiqu and Xinqiao Terminal 2.
- (Spain) 21 November – The new underground loop of the Topo of the Euskotren network enters operation between Lugartiz and Amara, serving downtown San Sebastián with two new stations.

== Predicted and scheduled events ==
=== November ===
- 30 November
  - (Germany) – The first phase of the aboveground Citybahn line of Essen's tram system will open between Am Freistein and Hindenburgstraße via Essen Hauptbahnhof. Line 107 will be rerouted onto the Citybahn, and line 108 will open between Abzweig Katernberg and Hindenburgstraße.
  - (United States) – The Red Line of the Saint Louis MetroLink is extended to MidAmerica Airport from Scott AFB.
- (China) – Line 8 of the Tianjin Metro extends from Lushuidao to Zhongbeizhen.
- (India) – Red Line of the Surat Metro opens between DREAM City and Althan Tenament.
- (South Korea) – Line 2 of the Busan Metro extends to Yangsan Central from Yangsan.
- (United States) – Amtrak Colorado Mountain Rail opens between Denver and Granby.

=== December ===
- (Kazakhstan) 1 December – Line 1 of Almaty Metro extends to Qalqaman from Bauyrjan Momyshuly.
- (Canada) 10 December – The Northlander resumes service between Cochrane and Toronto after a 14-year hiatus.
- (Malaysia) 12 December – Kota Bharu to Gombak section on the MRL East Coast Rail Link is scheduled to open.
- 13 December
  - (Norway) – Bane NOR opens the new double track on the Vestfold Line between Nykirke and Barkåker, enabling up to four trains per hour between Tønsberg and Oslo.
  - (Switzerland) – Phase 1 of the Lausanne Tramway opens between Lausanne-Flon and Renens-Gare.
  - (United Kingdom) – DfT Operator's Great Western Railway takes over the operations of Great Western Railway.
  - (Sweden) (Norway) – Following an agreement between the Swedish Government and SJ, night train service between Boden and Narvik resumes.
  - (Germany) (Netherlands) – Passenger services resume between Bad Bentheim and Coevorden.
  - (Germany) – The Rastatt Tunnel opens.
- (Netherlands) (Belgium) (France) 14 December – GoVolta begins a route between Amsterdam and Paris.
- (Turkey) 19 December – Line M12 of the Istanbul Metro opens between Kadıköy, Ataşehir and Ümraniye.
- 26 December
  - – Singapore MRT: Downtown Line extends to Sungei Bedok from Expo, while Thomson–East Coast Line of the Singapore MRT extends to Sungei Bedok from Bayshore.
  - – Wirye Line opens in Seoul, becoming the first tram line in South Korea since 1968.
- (Azerbaijan) – Purple Line of the Baku Metro extends to 20 September from 8 Noyabr.
- (China) – Line S5 of the Chengdu Metro opens between Honglian and Meishan East Railway Station.
- (Czech Republic) – RegioJet launches a direct train service between Prague, Havlíčkův Brod, Brno and Jihlava.
- (Dominican Republic) – The Santiago de los Caballeros Monorail opens between Cienfuegos and Terminal Central.
- (France) – Line T9 of the Lyon Tramway Network opens between Vaulx-en-Velin - La Soie and Charpennes - Charles Hernu.
- (Germany) – Line U4 of the Hamburg U-Bahn branches off to Horner Geest from Horner Rennbahn.
- (India) – Line 6 of the Mumbai Metro opens between Swami Samarth Nagar and Vikhroli EEH.
- (Italy) – Brescia To Verona Section of the Milan–Venice High Speed Railway opens between Brescia and Padua.
- (Poland) – Arriva RP introduces passenger services on Brodnica–Rypin and Wierzchucin–Laskowice routes.
- (South Korea) – Line 7 of the Seoul Subway extends to Goeup from Jangam.
- (Sweden) – The northern portion of West Link in Gothenburg opens, with trains initially turning around at Centralen.
- (Switzerland) – Giubiasco–Locarno railway: A second track opens between Contone and the bridge over the Ticino. The project, "AS25, Contone-Ponte Ticino: double track extension", includes the doubling of the track and the construction of the new "Monda" road underpass.
- (Switzerland) – Double-tracking of the S7 line of the Zurich S-Bahn between Opfikon and Kloten.
- (United Kingdom) – Grand Central starts operating passenger services to Cleethorpes and Grimsby.
- (United Kingdom) – Grand Central starts operating passenger services between Newcastle upon Tyne and Brighton.
- (India) – 2 new stations open on the Pune Metro's Pink Line, bringing the total number of stations to 19.

=== Unknown date ===
- (Armenia) (Turkey) – First possible date of reopening of Gyumri-Kars section of the Kars–Gyumri–Tbilisi railway, with the railway having been closed since 1993.
- (Austria) – New Stadler KISS double-deck trains of Railjet launched between Vienna and Salzburg.
- (Austria) (Italy) – Strutture Trasporto Alto Adige introduces Alstom Coradia trainsets on Ferrovia della Val Venosta.
- (Austria) (Slovakia) – ZSSK extends Humenné-Bratislava night train service to Vienna.
- (Azerbaijan) – Passenger trains start operation between Baku and Khankendi after construction of railway station in Khankendi.
- (Azerbaijan) – Completion of Horadiz–Ağbənd railway.
- (Azerbaijan) (Russia) – Passenger trains start operation between Baku and Nazran after modernisation of railway station in Sunzha.
- (Canada) – Line 1 of the Ottawa O-Train extends to Trim from Blair.
- (Czech Republic) – Chomutov-Kadaň railway is modernised.
- (China) – Changchun Rail Transit: Line 3 extends from Changying Shijicheng to Wenyuan Dalu, Line 1 extends from Hongzuizi to Yongchun Nan.
- (China) – Chaohu–Ma'anshan intercity railway opens between Chaohu East and Ma'anshan East.
- (China) – Guangzhou Metro: Middle section of Line 12 opens, connecting Guangzhou Gymnasium to Ersha Island, Line 13 extends from Tianhe Park to Yagang.
- (China) – Line 10 of the Hangzhou Metro extends from Yisheng Road to Renhe.
- (China) – Huaibei–Suzhou–Bengbu intercity railway opens between Huaibei North and Bengbu South.
- (China) – Huaibei-Fuyang Intercity Railway opens between Fuyang West and Shuangduiji.
- (China) – Jinan-Binzhou High-speed railway opens between Jinan East and Binzhou.
- (China) – Line 10 of the Ningbo Rail Transit opens between Kongpu and Cixi Railway Station.
- (China) – Line 2 of Qingdao Metro extends from Licun Park to International Horticultural Expo Garden
- (China) – Line 13 of the Shenzhen Metro extends to Dongjiaotou from Shenzhen Bay Checkpoint.
- (China) – Line 1 of the Shijiazhuang Metro extends from Fuze to Dongyang.
- (China) – Suzhou Metro: Line 2 extends to Aigehaolu from Qihe; Line 4 extends to Guantanglu from Longdaobang; Line 7 extends to Chunqiulu from Changlou.
- (China) – Xiong'an Rail Transit: Line R1 opens between Daxing Airport and Xiong'an Terminal.
- (France) – Line T10 of the Lyon Tramway Network opens between Gare de Vénissieux and Halle Tony Garnier.
- (France) – MF 19 rolling stock enters operation on Line 7bis of the Paris Metro.
- (Germany) – Line 1 of the Bremen Tramway Network branches off to Willakedamm from Roland-Center.
- (Hungary) (Serbia) – Budapest–Belgrade railway, part of Budapest–Belgrade–Skopje–Athens railway, opens.
- (India) – The Orange Line of the Kolkata Metro extends from Beleghata to Salt Lake Sector V.
- (Italy) – Battipaglia – Romagnano section of the Salerno – Reggio Calabria high speed line opens.
- (Italy) – Bologna Tramway Network: Line 1 opens between Borgo Panigale and Fiera/CAAB; Line 2 opens between Via dei Mille and Corticella.
- (Italy) – Catania Metro extends to Paterno from Monte Po.
- (Italy) – Line 1 of the Naples Metro extends to Tribunale from Centro Direzionale.
- (Portugal) – Line H of the Porto Metro partially opens from Casa da Música to Campo Alegre and from Santo Ovídio to Arrábida.
- (South Korea) – Chungbuk Line is upgraded to 230 km/h (140 mph) between Jochiwon and Jecheon.
- (South Korea) – Janghang Line is upgraded to 250 km/h (160 mph) between Cheonan and Iksan.
- (South Korea) – Seohae Line of the Seoul Subway extends to Seohwaseongnamyang from Wonsi.
- (South Korea) – Opening of the bypass of the Gyeongbu Line from Suwon to the Gyeongbu High Speed Railway
- (South Korea) – Yangsan Line of the Busan Metro opens between Nopo and Bukjeong.
- (Spain) – HSR link to Madrid–Barajas Airport opens.
- (Sweden) – North Bothnia Line opens between Umeå and Dåva.
- (Taiwan) – Green Line of the Taoyuan Metro opens between Bade and Hengshan.
- (Turkey) – Bandırma-Bursa-Osmaneli High-speed rail opens between Bandırma and Bursa.
- (United Kingdom) – West Midlands Metro branches off to Dudley from Wednesbury.
