= GWR =

GWR may refer to:

== Transport ==
- Great Western Railway, former British railway company (1833–1947)
- Great Western Railway (train operating company), British railway company (1996–)
- Great Western Main Line, a railway line in the UK
- Great Western Railway (disambiguation), other railway companies and routes with the name
- Gloucestershire Warwickshire Railway, an English heritage railway
- Aura Airlines (ICAO airline code: GWR), a Spanish airline
- Gwinner–Roger Melroe Field (FAA airport code: GWR), Sargent County, North Dakota, USA

== Media ==
- GWR Group, a defunct British commercial radio company, merged into GCap Media in 2005
  - GWR FM (Bristol & Bath)
  - GWR FM Wiltshire
- GWR Records, a British record label
- Graswurzelrevolution, a German anarcho-pacifist magazine

== Other uses ==
- Geographically weighted regression
- Gwere language (ISO 639 language code: gwr)
- Llygad Gŵr, 13th-century Welsh poet
- Guinness World Records
