= Michałów Reginów railway station =

Railway station in Michałów-Reginów, Poland

Michałów Reginów

General information
- Location: Michałów-Reginów, Wieliszew, Legionowo, Masovian; Poland
- Coordinates: 52°24′41″N 20°57′16″E
- System: Rail Station
- Owner: Polskie Koleje Państwowe S.A.

Services
Preceding station	Masovian Railways	Following station
Legionowo Piaski towards Legionowo	R92	Wieliszew towards Tłuszcz
Preceding station	SKM Warsaw	Following station
Legionowo Piaski towards Warsaw Chopin Airport	S3	Wieliszew towards Radzymin
Legionowo Piaski towards Piaseczno	S4	Wieliszew towards Zegrze Południowe
Location

Michałów Reginów railway station is a railway station in Michałów-Reginów, Legionowo, Poland. It is served by Rapid Urban Railway (Warsaw) and Masovian Railways.

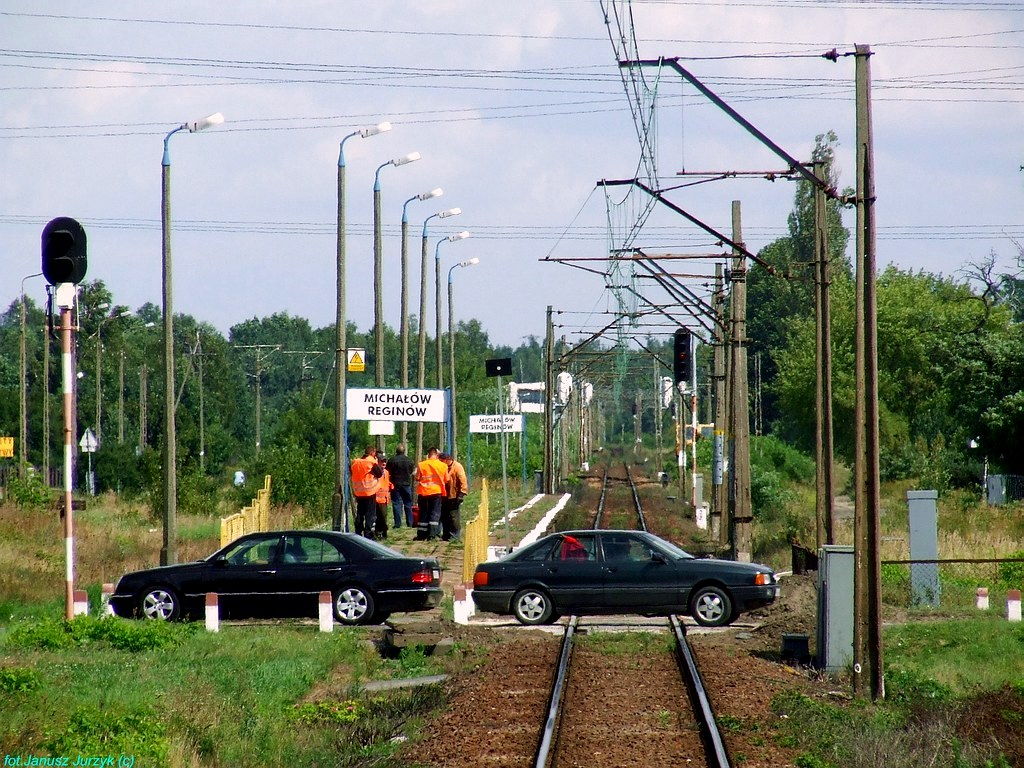
Michałów Reginów railway station
