= Koziki railway station =

Railway station in Koziki, north-eastern Poland

Koziki
- A special train at the disused station in September 2012, prior to its reopening

General information
- Location: Koziki, Podlaskie Voivodeship; Poland
- Coordinates: 53°05′58.0″N 22°02′26.1″E
- Owner: PKP Polskie Linie Kolejowe
- Line: Śniadowo–Łomża
- Platforms: 1
- Tracks: 1
- Train operators: Polregio

History
- Opened: 14 June 2026

Services
| Preceding station | Polregio | Following station |
|---|---|---|
| Śniadowo towards Białystok or Ostrołęka | PR | Konarzyce towards Łomża |
Location
- Location within Poland Location within Podlaskie Voivodeship

Koziki is a railway station on the Śniadowo–Łomża railway in the village of Koziki, Łomża County, within the Podlaskie Voivodeship in north-eastern Poland.

== History ==
The station originally opened on 27 January 1949. It closed, along with the Śniadowo–Łomża railway, on 31 March 1993. Part of the revitalisation of the railway, the station was rebuilt in 2025–2026. It reopened on 14 June 2026.

== Train services ==
The station is served by the following services:

- Regional services (PR) Białystok - Łapy - Łomża - Ostrołęka
