= Krusze railway station =

Railway station in Masovian Voivodeship, Poland

Krusze
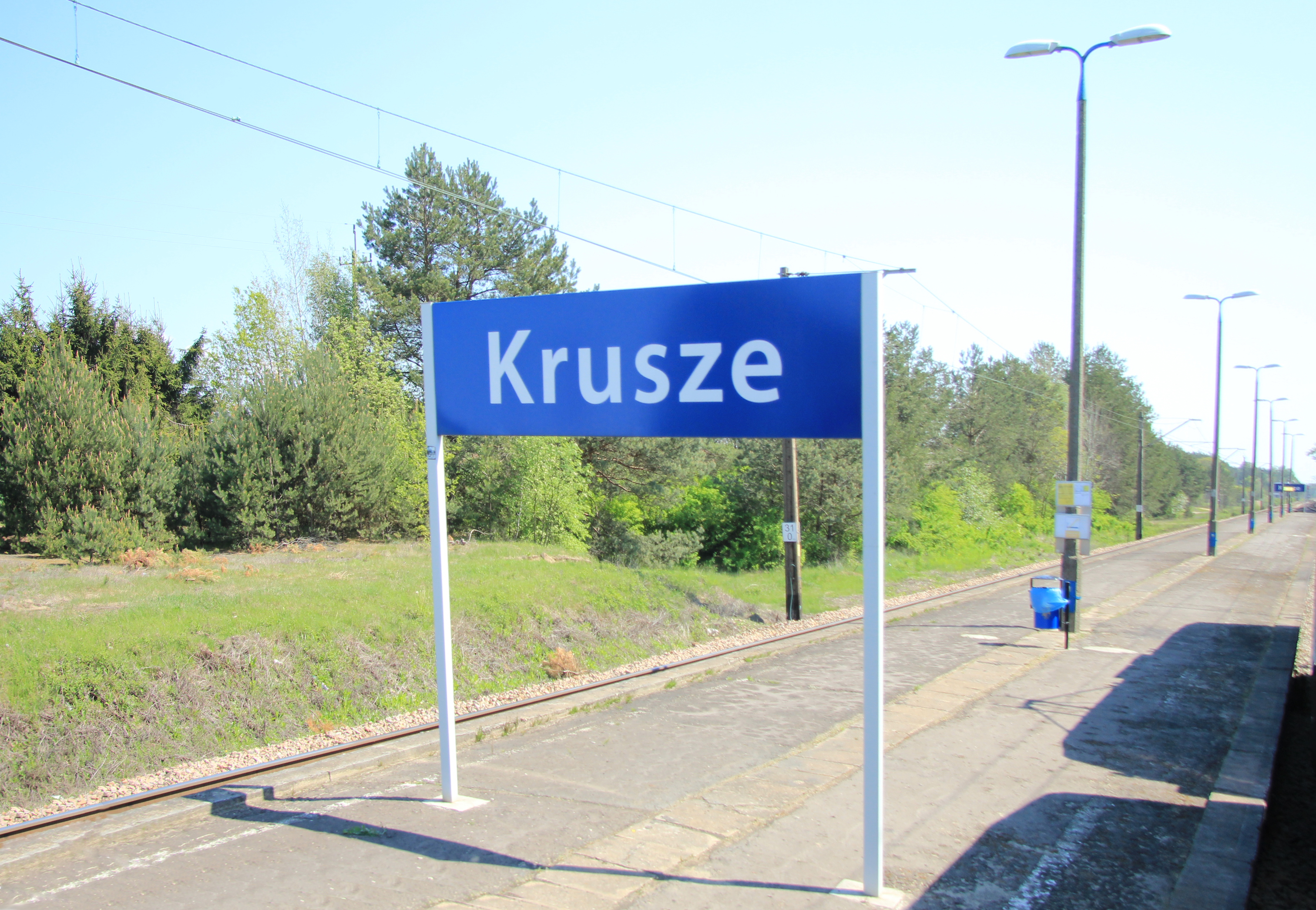

General information
- Location: Krusze, Klembów, Wołomin, Masovian; Poland
- Coordinates: 52°25′39″N 21°22′30″E
- System: Rail Station
- Owner: Polskie Koleje Państwowe S.A.

Services
Preceding station	Masovian Railways	Following station
Radzymin towards Legionowo	R92	Tłuszcz Terminus
Location

Krusze railway station is a railway station in Krusze, Masovian Voivodeship, Poland. It is served by Masovian Railways.
