= Wieliszew railway station =

Railway station in Michałów-Reginów, Poland

Wieliszew
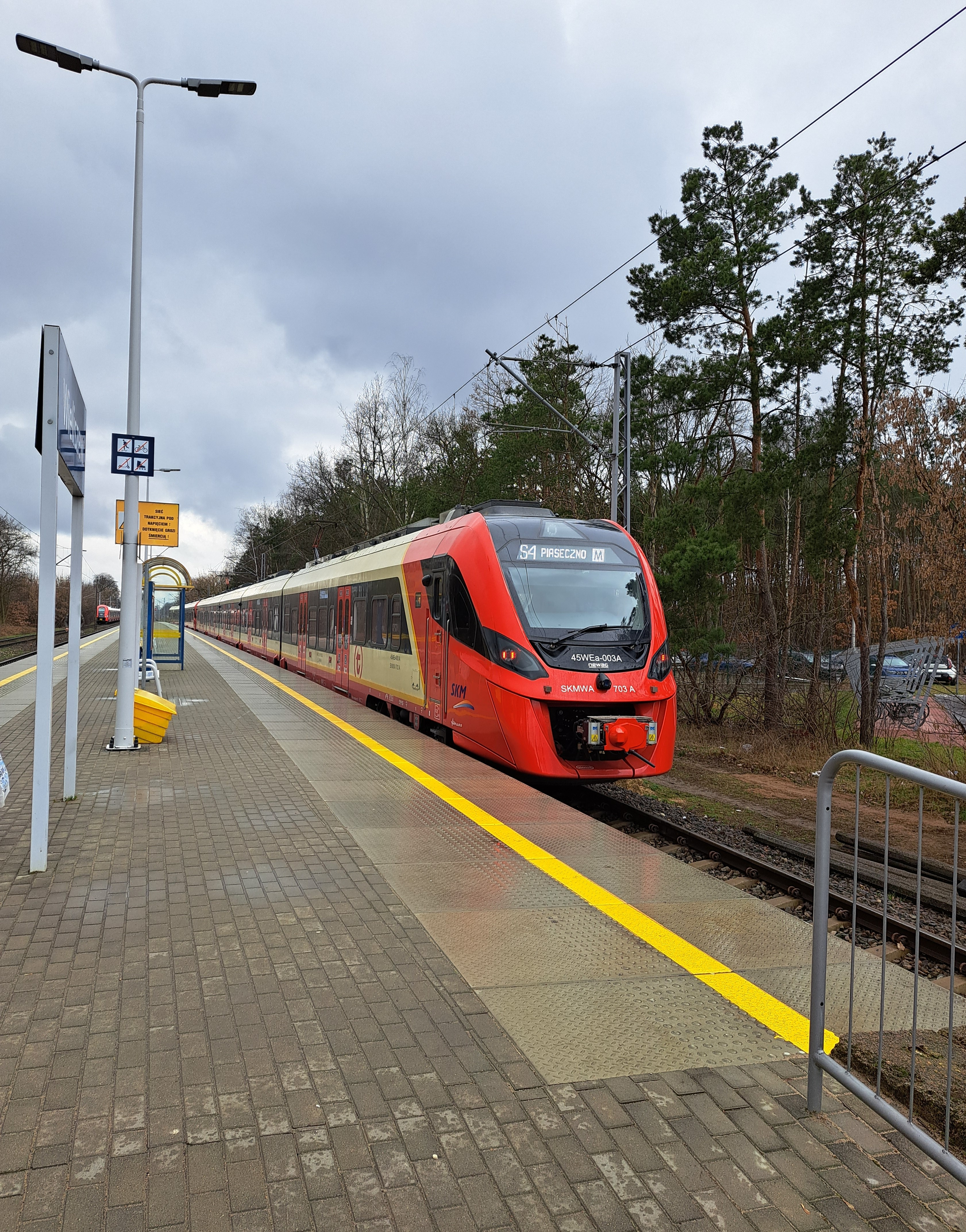

General information
- Location: Michałów-Reginów, Wieliszew, Legionowo County, Masovian; Poland
- Coordinates: 52°25′46″N 20°58′36″E
- System: Rail Station
- Owner: Polskie Koleje Państwowe S.A.

Services
Preceding station	Masovian Railways	Following station
Michałów Reginów towards Legionowo	R92	Nieporęt towards Tłuszcz
Preceding station	SKM Warsaw	Following station
Michałów Reginów towards Warsaw Chopin Airport	S3	Nieporęt towards Radzymin
Michałów Reginów towards Piaseczno	S4	Wieliszew Centrum towards Zegrze Południowe
Location

Wieliszew railway station is a railway station in Michałów-Reginów, Wieliszew Commune, Legionowo County, Poland. It is served by Rapid Urban Railway (Warsaw) and Masovian Railways.
