= Sitki =

Sitki may refer to:

== People ==
Sitki is a spelling of the name Sidqi.

== Places ==
- Sitki, Masovian Voivodeship, Polish village
- Sitki, Silesian Voivodeship, Polish village
