= Tuł, Masovian Voivodeship =

Tuł
- Village
- Location within Poland
- Coordinates: 52°23′N 21°24′E
- Country: Poland
- Voivodeship: Masovian
- County: Wołomin
- Gmina: Klembów
- Population: 324

Tuł [tuu̯] is a village in the administrative district of Gmina Klembów, within Wołomin County, Masovian Voivodeship, in east-central Poland. The village of Tuł covers an area of approximately 4 square kilometres and has a population of 324 as of late 2024.

== History ==
Archaeological findings indicate that human activity in the area of present-day Tuł dates to between 1900 and 1100 B.C.E. The village of Tuł is first confirmed in historical records from 1580. This suggests that while the region was inhabited since ancient times, the settlement itself emerged much later.

In the late 18th century, Tuł was owned by Stanisław Kostka Krajewski (recorded in 1783–1784), and in the mid-19th century by Karol Kurella (1850–1851), who was later succeeded by his son Robert Kurella. In 1827, the village had a population of 212 residents living in 28 houses. Tuł was part of the Commune of Klembów and belonged to the parish of Poświętne.
