= Pasek, Wołomin County =

Pasek
- Village
- Location within Poland
- Coordinates: 52°23′15″N 21°18′51″E
- Country: Poland
- Voivodeship: Masovian
- County: Wołomin
- Gmina: Klembów

Pasek [ˈpasɛk] is a village in the administrative district of Gmina Klembów, within Wołomin County, Masovian Voivodeship, in east-central Poland.
