= Konarzyce railway station =

Railway station in Konarzyce, north-eastern Poland

Konarzyce

General information
- Location: Konarzyce, Podlaskie Voivodeship; Poland
- Coordinates: 53°08′39.800″N 22°02′45.672″E
- Owner: PKP Polskie Linie Kolejowe
- Line: Śniadowo–Łomża
- Platforms: 1
- Tracks: 1
- Train operators: Polregio

History
- Opened: 14 June 2026

Services
Preceding station	Polregio	Following station
Koziki towards Białystok or Ostrołęka	PR	Łomża Terminus
Location
- Location within Poland Location within Podlaskie Voivodeship

Konarzyce is a railway station on the Śniadowo–Łomża railway in the village of Konarzyce, Łomża County, within the Podlaskie Voivodeship in north-eastern Poland.

== History ==
The station was built in 2025–2026 as part of the revitalisation of the Śniadowo–Łomża railway after its closure in 1993. It opened, along with the Śniadowo–Łomża railway on 14 June 2026.

== Train services ==
The station is served by the following services:

- Regional services (PR) Białystok - Łapy - Łomża - Ostrołęka
