= Wudangshan West railway station =

Railway station in Ankang, Shaanxi

Wudangshan West 武当山西
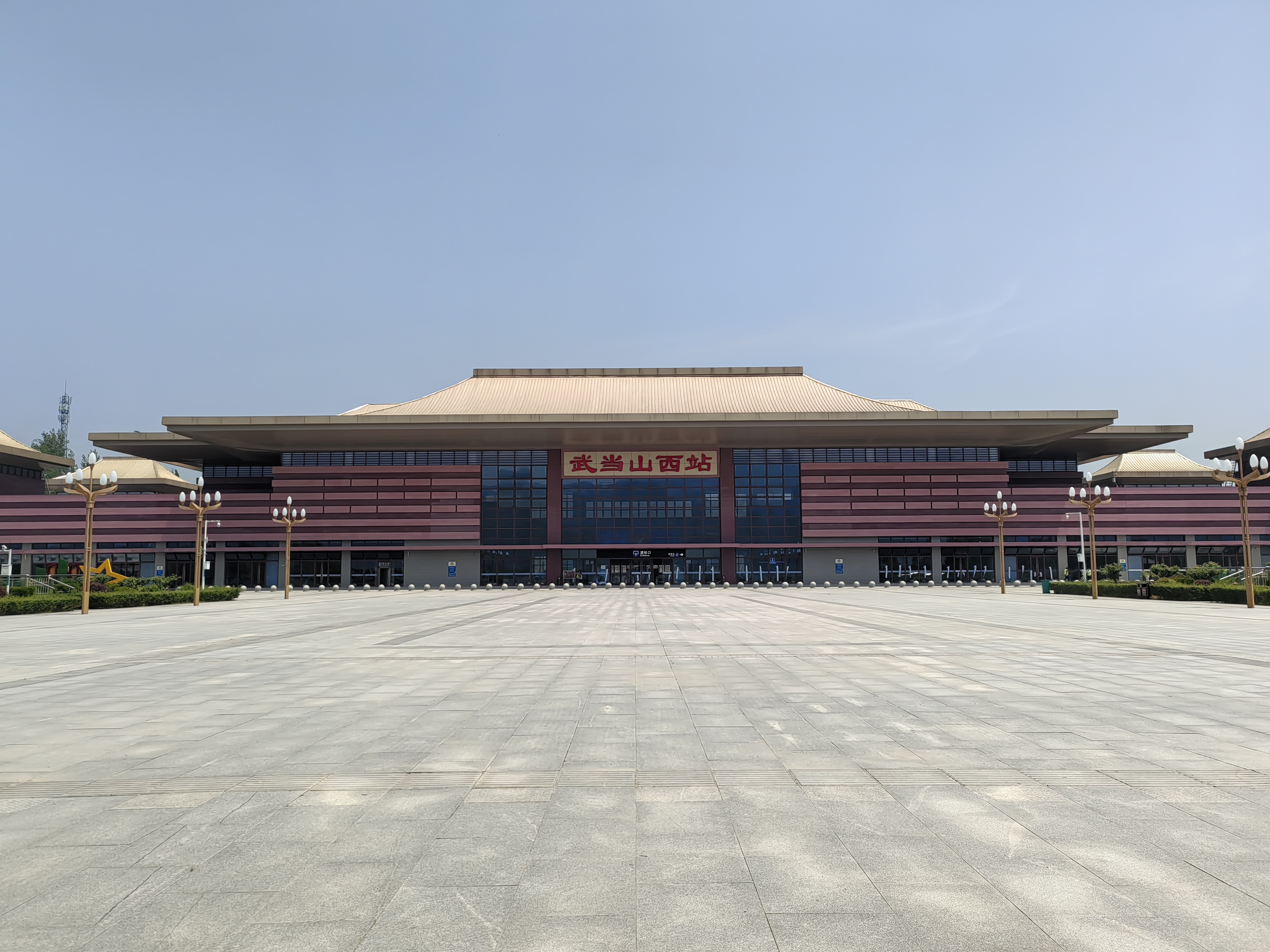
- Wudangshan West railway station in 2025

General information
- Location: Xunyang, Ankang, Shaanxi; China
- Coordinates: 32°32′22.06″N 111°0′29.17″E
- Operated by: China Railway Wuhan Group
- Line: Wuhan–Shiyan high-speed railway

History
- Opened: 29 November 2019
Location

Wudangshan West railway station (Chinese: 武当山西站) is a railway station in Xunyang, Ankang, Shaanxi, China.

Construction on the station began in 2015. It opened on 29 November 2019.

Preceding station	China Railway High-speed	Following station
Danjiangkou towards Hankou	Wuhan–Shiyan high-speed railway	Shiyan East Terminus
