= Karolew, Gmina Klembów =

Karolew
- Village
- Location within Poland
- Coordinates: 52°22′37″N 21°24′27″E
- Country: Poland
- Voivodeship: Masovian
- County: Wołomin
- Gmina: Klembów

Karolew [kaˈrɔlɛf] is a village in the administrative district of Gmina Klembów, within Wołomin County, Masovian Voivodeship, in east-central Poland.
