= Ostrówek, Gmina Klembów =

Ostrówek
- Village
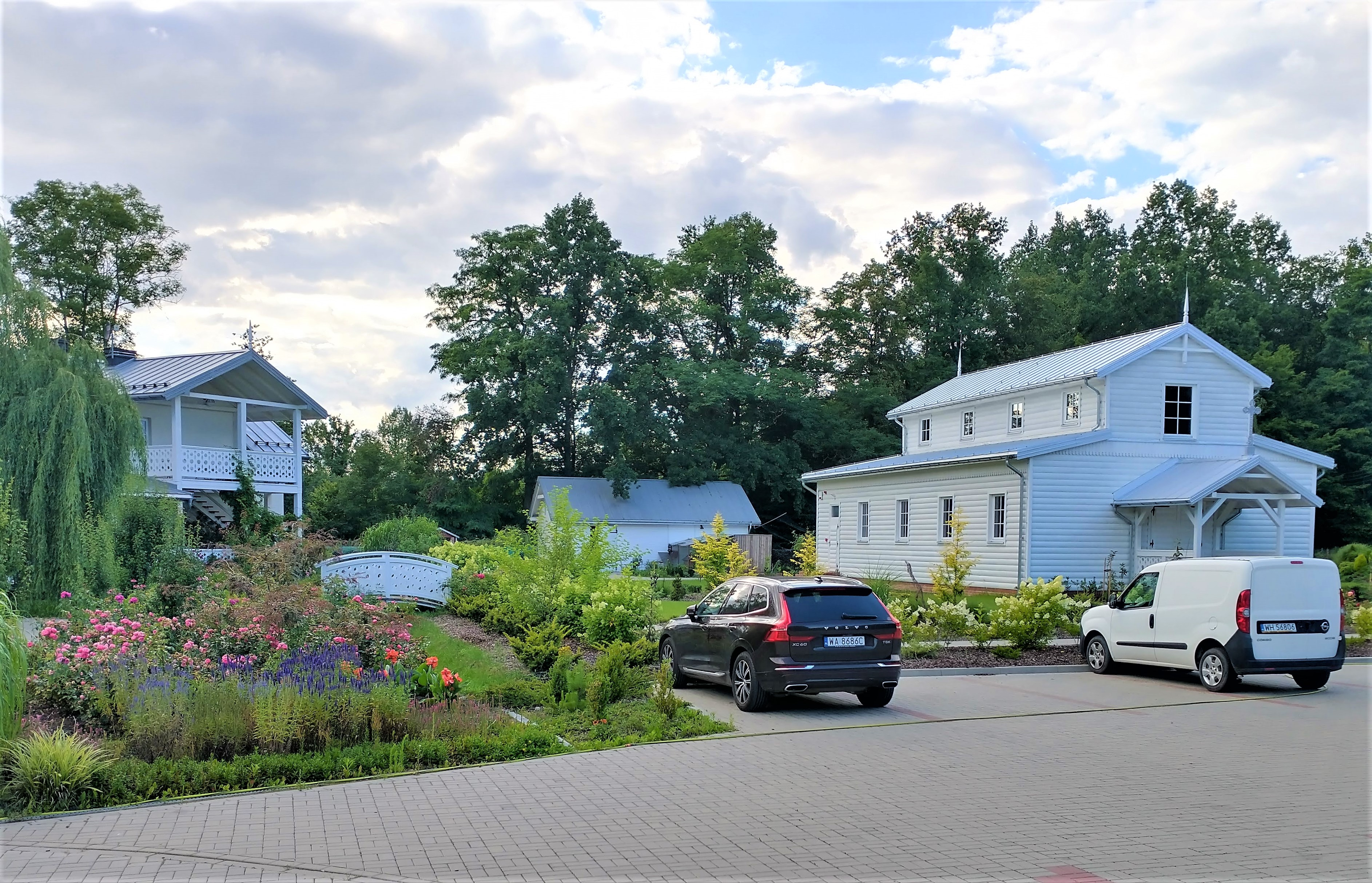
- Lipszyc Manor in Ostrówek

- Location within Poland
- Coordinates: 52°23′N 21°22′E
- Country: Poland
- Voivodeship: Masovian
- County: Wołomin
- Gmina: Klembów

Population
  - Total: 1,800
- Time zone: UTC+1 (CET)
  - Summer (DST): UTC+2 (CEST)

Ostrówek [ɔsˈtruvɛk] is a village in the administrative district of Gmina Klembów, within Wołomin County, Masovian Voivodeship, in east-central Poland.

Nine Polish citizens were murdered by Nazi Germany in the village during World War II.
