= Krzywica, Wołomin County =

Krzywica
- Village
- Location within Poland
- Coordinates: 52°23′N 21°21′E
- Country: Poland
- Voivodeship: Masovian
- County: Wołomin
- Gmina: Klembów

Krzywica [kʂɨˈvit͡sa] is a village in the administrative district of Gmina Klembów, within Wołomin County, Masovian Voivodeship, in east-central Poland.
