= Shiyan East railway station =

Railway station in Shiyan, Hubei

Shiyan East 十堰东
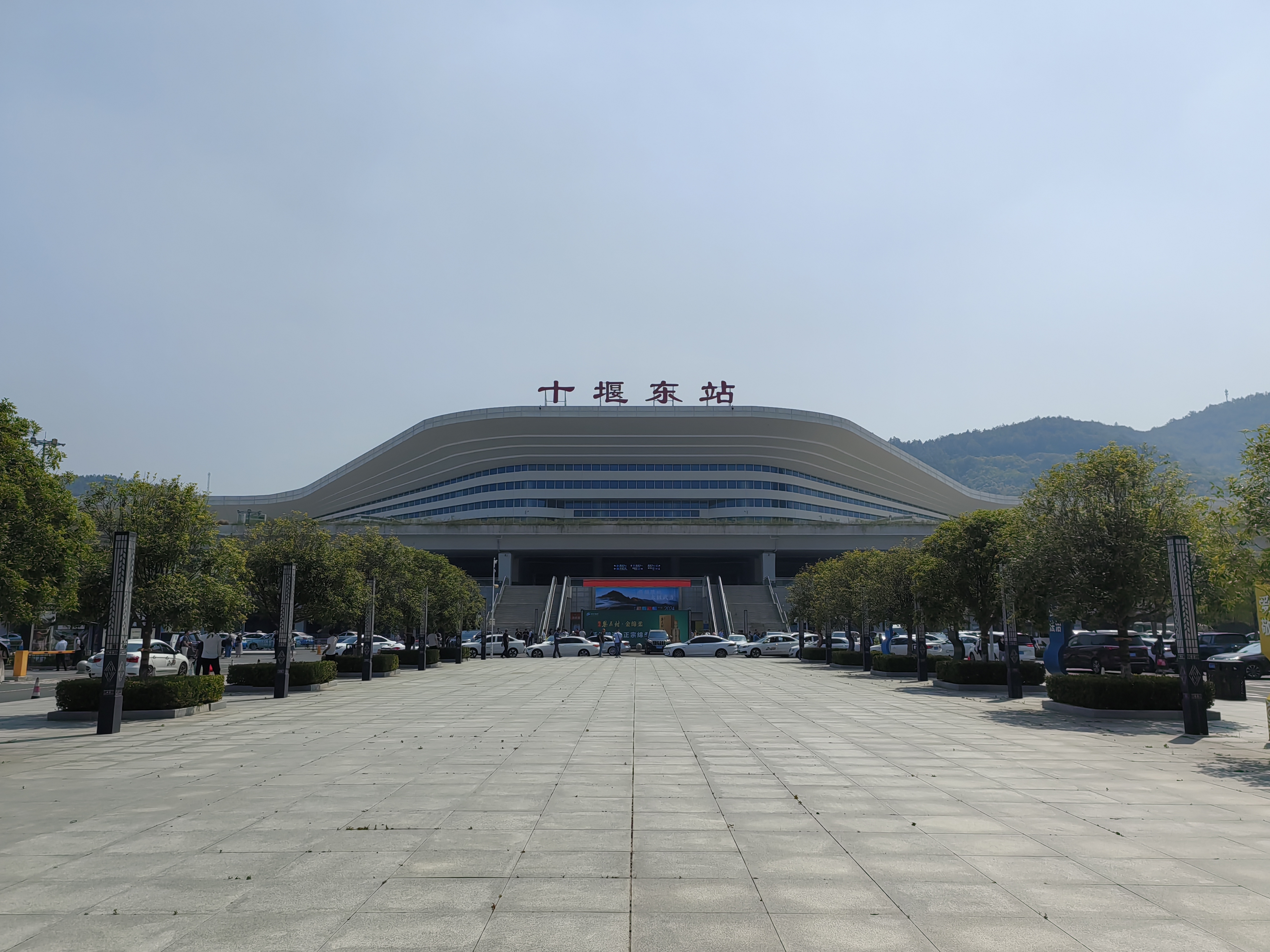

General information
- Location: Zhangwan District, Shiyan, Hubei; China
- Lines: Wuhan–Shiyan high-speed railway; Shiyan–Xi'an high-speed railway (under construction)

History
- Opened: 29 December 2019
Location

Shiyan East railway station (Chinese: 十堰东站) is a railway station in Zhangwan District, Shiyan, Hubei, China.

== History ==
The station opened with the Wuhan–Shiyan high-speed railway on 29 December 2019.

== Position ==
The station is currently the terminus of the Wuhan–Shiyan high-speed railway. On opening of the Shiyan–Xi'an high-speed railway, the station will become an intermediate stop on a high-speed route from Wuhan to Xi'an.

| Preceding station | China Railway High-speed | Following station |
|---|---|---|
| Wudangshan West towards Hankou | Wuhan–Shiyan high-speed railway | Terminus |
| Terminus | Shiyan–Xi'an high-speed railway | Yunxi towards Xi'an East |
