= Michałów, Wołomin County =

Michałów
- Village
- Location within Poland
- Coordinates: 52°25′N 21°19′E
- Country: Poland
- Voivodeship: Masovian
- County: Wołomin
- Gmina: Klembów

Michałów [miˈxawuf] is a village in the administrative district of Gmina Klembów, within Wołomin County, Masovian Voivodeship, in east-central Poland.
