= Roszczep =

- Village
- Location within Poland
- Coordinates: 52°27′N 21°19′E
- Country: Poland
- Voivodeship: Masovian
- County: Wołomin
- Gmina: Klembów
- Population: 385

Roszczep [ˈrɔʂt͡ʂɛp] is a village in the administrative district of Gmina Klembów, within Wołomin County, Masovian Voivodeship, in east-central Poland.
