= Dobczyn, Masovian Voivodeship =

Dobczyn
- Village
- Location within Poland
- Coordinates: 52°23′N 21°18′E
- Country: Poland
- Voivodeship: Masovian
- County: Wołomin
- Gmina: Klembów

Dobczyn [ˈdɔpt͡ʂɨn] is a village in the administrative district of Gmina Klembów, within Wołomin County, Masovian Voivodeship, in east-central Poland.
