= Pieńki, Wołomin County =

Pieńki
- Village
- Location within Poland
- Coordinates: 52°24′56″N 21°21′54″E
- Country: Poland
- Voivodeship: Masovian
- County: Wołomin
- Gmina: Klembów

Pieńki [ˈpjɛɲki] is a village in the administrative district of Gmina Klembów, within Wołomin County, Masovian Voivodeship, in east-central Poland.
