= Great Western Railway (disambiguation) =

Great Western Railway was a British railway company operating from 1833 to 1947.

Great Western Railway or Great Western Railroad may also refer to the following:

== Rail companies and routes ==
=== Australia ===
- Great Western Railway, New South Wales, Australia, an alternative name of the Main Western Line
- Great Western Railway, Queensland, Australia
- Great Western Railway (Tasmania), Australia

=== Canada ===
- Great Western Railway (Ontario)
- Great Western Railway (Saskatchewan)

=== United Kingdom ===
- Great Western Railway (train operating company), from 1996
- Great Western Railway (2026), future state-owned British train operating company
- Great Western Main Line, main line railway in England, from London Paddington to Bristol Temple Meads

=== United States ===
- Atlantic and Great Western Railroad (1853–1880)
- Chicago Great Western Railway (1885–1968)
- Great Western Railway of Colorado
- Great Western Railroad (Illinois) (1853–65)
- Great Western Railway of Iowa
- Great Western Railroad (Ohio)
- New Orleans, Opelousas and Great Western Railroad (1854–1869), became part of the Southern Pacific Company

=== Elsewhere ===
- Argentine Great Western Railway, Argentina
- Great Western Railway of Brazil
- Midland Great Western Railway, Ireland

== Other uses ==
- Rain, Steam and Speed – The Great Western Railway, a painting by J.M.W. Turner
