= Łomża railway station =

Railway station in Łomża, north-eastern Poland

Łomża
- Station in June 2026

General information
- Location: Łomża, Podlaskie Voivodeship; Poland
- Coordinates: 53°10′24.5″N 22°03′56.9″E
- Owner: PKP Polskie Linie Kolejowe
- Line: Śniadowo–Łomża
- Platforms: 2
- Tracks: 2
- Train operators: Polregio; PKP Intercity

History
- Opened: 14 June 2026
- Former names: Lomza (1915–1918)

Services
Preceding station	Polregio	Following station
Konarzyce towards Białystok or Ostrołęka	PR	Terminus
Location
- Location within Poland Location within Podlaskie Voivodeship

Łomża is a railway station on the Śniadowo–Łomża railway in the city of Łomża, in the Podlaskie Voivodeship in north-eastern Poland.

The station originally opened in 1915, and was closed between 1993 and until its reopening in 2026, after the revitalisation of the Śniadowo–Łomża railway. It is served by Polregio and PKP Intercity trains.

== History ==
The station originally opened as Lomza on 1 January 1915. It was initially to serve as a temporary termini, in plans of extending the newly opened Śniadowo–Łomża railway north towards Kolno and Pisz; however this plan never went ahead due to the difficult geopolitical situation during World War I. The concept resurfaced in December 1924 during the Second Polish Republic period, but it was thwarted by the country's difficult economic situation. Despite this, an undeveloped strip of land, which is adjacent to the northern part of the station, was deliberately set aside as a land reserve for the failed project.

Łomża, together with the Śniadowo–Łomża railway, closed to regular passenger services on 31 March 1993; it continued to handle freight trains, and occasionally saw special trains.

=== Revitalisation and reopening ===
In August 2016, among other projects in the region, PKP Polskie Linie Kolejowe (PLK) announced the placement of the Śniadowo–Łomża railway on a reserve list for its revitalisation, part of the Regional Operational Programme (RPO), as 2.5 billion PLN was invested in rail transport of the Podlaskie Voivodeship. An environmental study was issued, however the project was halted due to a lack of funding.

In 2018–2019, a partial replacement of the track sleepers was carried out in anticipation of increased freight traffic. In April 2019, the revitalisation project was proposed to enter the Kolej+ programme. It entered the programme in July 2023 when the Podlaskie Voivodeship signed an agreement with PLK, were 430 million PLN was allocated for the revitalisation of the Śniadowo–Łomża railway and extensive modernisation of the Łapy–Śniadowo section of the Ostrołęka–Łapy railway, totalling to around 77 km (48 mi) of track. Unlike the previous plan, it came to a conclusion that the line would not be electrified part of this project in order to cut costs, although the Śniadowo–Łomża railway was placed on the "top priority" list of railway lines planned for electrification.

The station was rebuilt in 2025–2026. The first non-revenue train on the revitalised line ran on 13 June 2026, transporting Prime Minister Donald Tusk and Minister of Infrastrucutre Dariusz Klimczak. Łomża officially opened on 14 June as part the summer timetable. Ultimately, the station is planned to receive direct PKP Intercity services to Warsaw in June 2027 following the extensive modernisation of the Mostówka–Ostrołęka section. On 31 August PLK signed a contract, valued 9.6 million PLN for the construction of a station building for Łomża. The project is scheduled to be completed by the first quarter of 2028.

== Special trains (1993–2026) ==
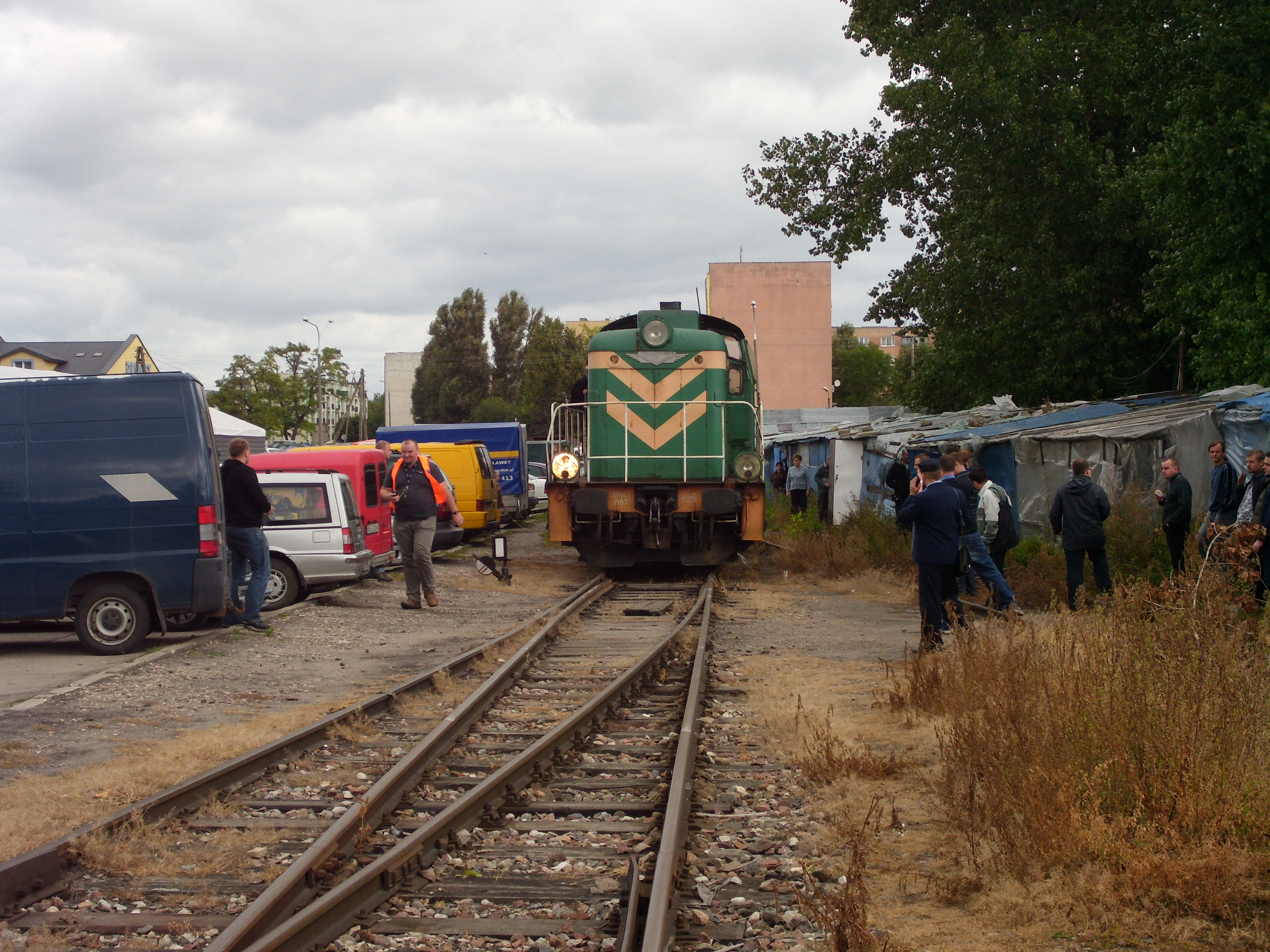
A PKP class SM42 at the station during a railtour on 8 September 2012

The following special trains ran railtours to Łomża during its closure between 1993–2026:

- 10 January 2010: In celebration of the Great Orchestra of Christmas Charity, a train operated by PKP class SA133 working Łomża – Śniadowo;
- 8 September 2012: PKP class SM42 working Białystok – Ostrów Mazowiecka – Białystok
- 20 October 2013: In celebration of the 120th anniversary of the Vistula Railway, a train formed of SA133-019 and SA133-20 working Łapy – Śniadowo – Łomża.
- 10 February 2019: TurKol rail tour, operated by DSB class MR working Ostrołęka – Łomża – Ostrołęka

== Train services ==
The station is served by the following services:

- Regional services (PR) Białystok - Łapy - Łomża - Ostrołęka
- Inctercity services (IC) Olsztyn Główny - Śniadowo – Łomża - Białystok
