= Nowy Kraszew =

- Village
- Location within Poland
- Coordinates: 52°23′21″N 21°17′2″E
- Country: Poland
- Voivodeship: Masovian
- County: Wołomin
- Gmina: Klembów

Nowy Kraszew [ˈnɔvɨ ˈkraʂɛf] is a village in the administrative district of Gmina Klembów, within Wołomin County, Masovian Voivodeship, in east-central Poland.
