= Stary Kraszew =

- Village
- Location within Poland
- Coordinates: 52°24′20″N 21°15′40″E
- Country: Poland
- Voivodeship: Masovian
- County: Wołomin
- Gmina: Klembów
- Population: 340

Stary Kraszew [ˈstarɨ ˈkraʂɛf] is a village in the administrative district of Gmina Klembów, within Wołomin County, Masovian Voivodeship, in east-central Poland.
