= Yangsan Metro =

Light metro line in South Korea

Overview
- Native name: 양산 도시철도; Yangsan dosicheoldo
- Status: Under Construction
- Termini: Nopo; Bukjeong
- Stations: 7

Service
- Type: Rapid transit
- System: Busan Metro
- Services: 1
- Operator: Busan Transportation Corporation

History
- Planned opening: November 2026

Technical
- Line length: 11.43 km (7.10 mi)
- Number of tracks: 1
- Track gauge: 1,700 mm (5 ft 6 15/16 in)
- Electrification: 750 V DC guide bars

Yangsan Metro (also known as Busan Metro Yangsan Line) is an under construction rubber-tyred metro line connecting Nopo station in Nopo-dong, Geumjeong District, Busan and Bukjeong station in Bukjeong-dong, Yangsan, South Gyeongsang Province, South Korea. Originally, it was promoted as the Nopo-Bukjeong line. The line is mostly single-tracked with passing loops at each station.

It includes the project to extend the Busan Metro Line 2 to Yangsan Sports Complex station, and the line will connect the northern termini of Line 1 and Line 2. scheduled to open in June 2026.

== Rolling stock ==
The line will use similar K-AGT driverless trains used on Busan Metro Line 4. The vehicle depot will be built in Seoksan-ri, Dong-myeon, Yangsan.

== List of stations ==
Station Number	Station name			Transfer	Distance in km	Total distance	Location	
Station Number	English	Hangul	Hanja	Transfer	Distance in km	Total distance	Location	
101	Nopo	노포	老圃	Busan Metro Line 1	---	0.0	Busan	Geumjeong
102	Sasong	사송	沙松		2.8	2.8	Yangsan	South Gyeongsang
103	Naesong	내송	內松		1.6	4.5	Yangsan	South Gyeongsang
104	Yangsan City Hall	양산시청	梁山市廳		3.8	8.3	Yangsan	South Gyeongsang
105	Yangsanjungang	양산중앙	梁山中央	Busan Metro Line 2	1.0	9.3	Yangsan	South Gyeongsang
106	Singi	신기	新基		1.4	10.7	Yangsan	South Gyeongsang
107	Bukjeong	북정	北亭		1.8	12.5	Yangsan	South Gyeongsang

== See also ==
- Busan Metro
- Transportation in South Korea
