= Gmina Klembów =

Gmina Klembów Klembów Commune
- Gmina
- Coat of arms

- Location within Poland
- Coordinates (Klembów): 52°24′22″N 21°19′52″E
- Country: Poland
- Voivodeship: Masovian
- County: Wołomin
- Seat: Klembów

Area
  - Total: 85.79 km^{2} (33.12 sq mi)

Population (2013)
  - Total: 9,493
  - Density: 110.7/km^{2} (286.6/sq mi)
- Website: http://www.klembow.pl

Gmina Klembów is a rural gmina (administrative district) in Wołomin County, Masovian Voivodeship, in east-central Poland. Its seat is the village of Klembów, which lies approximately 10 kilometres (6 mi) north-east of Wołomin and 31 km (19 mi) north-east of Warsaw.

The gmina covers an area of 85.79 square kilometres (33.1 sq mi), and as of late 2024 its total population is 10,823 (9,493 in 2013).

== Villages ==
Gmina Klembów contains the villages and settlements of Dobczyn, Karolew, Klembów, Krusze, Krzywica, Lipka, Michałów, Nowy Kraszew, Ostrówek, Pasek, Pieńki, Rasztów, Roszczep, Sitki, Stary Kraszew, Tuł and Wola Rasztowska.

== Neighbouring gminas ==
Gmina Klembów is bordered by the gminas of Dąbrówka, Poświętne, Radzymin, Tłuszcz and Wołomin.

== History ==
Archaeological discoveries indicate that human presence in the area of today’s Klembów commune dates back to the late Pleistocene, around 11,000 B.C.E. Excavations conducted in the 20th century uncovered flint tools, pottery, and cremation remains from various archaeological cultures, including the Funnel Beaker (3600–2300 B.C.E.) and Trzciniec (1900–1100 B.C.E.) cultures, as well as artifacts from the Roman period. The settlement of Klembów itself existed by the early Polish state, with traces of buildings and a cobbled street from the 10th or 11th century, and its parish—established before 1075—became part of the Diocese of Płock that same year.

The first wooden church in Klembów, founded by a member of the Woliński family of the Lubicz coat of arms, was consecrated between 1333 and 1357 by Bishop Klemens Pierzchała of Płock. After nearly three centuries, a new church was consecrated in 1629 but was destroyed in 1656 during the Swedish invasion. A small oratory was built two years later thanks to local noble families, and by the end of the 17th century, a new church was finally erected and consecrated in 1699 by Bishop Andrzej Chryzostom Załuski. The building deteriorated over the following decades, suffering losses during the Kościuszko Uprising, and in 1823 plans were made for the construction of another wooden church. In 1870, the Klembów commune had a population of 4,095 residents, including 3,892 Catholics, 147 Jews, and 56 Protestants. Most inhabitants were engaged in agriculture, while 45 worked as craftsmen—the highest number of artisans among communes in the Radzymin County.

In September 1906, a fire that began in a barn rapidly spread through Klembów, destroying around 50 houses and 60 farm buildings along with harvests and food supplies, leading to famine among the villagers.

Following Poland’s defeat in the September Campaign of 1939, the area became part of the General Government, within the Warsaw District of the Warsaw County. During the occupation, local residents organized resistance against the Germans; among them was Stanisław Dziedzic of Klembów, a student of the Warsaw School of Political Science and commander of the Tłuszcz unit of the Komenda Obrońców Polski. Arrested in 1940 while transporting underground press materials, he was imprisoned at Pawiak, interrogated on Szucha Avenue, and executed in Palmiry on 17 September 1940.

== Ownership ==
During the 17th century, Klembów was a private noble village (wieś szlachecka) within the Mazovian Province of the Crown of the Kingdom of Poland. Initially owned by minor Mazovian nobility likely connected to nearby Radzymin estates, the village later passed through the Łączyński and Dłużniewski families before coming under the control of the Sobolewski family toward the end of the century. Its wooden parish church, dedicated to Saint Clement, was destroyed in 1656 during the Swedish Deluge, when Klembów and the surrounding area suffered extensive devastation. Following the mid-17th-century wars, the settlement gradually rebuilt around a modest manor and parish, retaining its agricultural character and remaining part of the network of small noble estates typical of the region.

Around 1775, the estate was owned by Dominik Sobolewski, huntsman of Nur, and later passed to the Czarnocki family, local nobility associated with other Mazovian estates. In 1822, General Franciszek Żymirski (1779–1831), a Napoleonic officer, veteran of the Duchy of Warsaw, and participant in the November Uprising, purchased Klembów along with nearby villages (Zamość, Krusze, and Borki). Żymirski expanded and modernized the estate, constructing brick farm buildings, a bakery, and a distillery, and funded the construction of a new neo-classical Church of St. Clement (1823–1829), replacing the earlier wooden church destroyed during the Swedish wars. Żymirski was killed near Wawer in 1831 during the uprising and was buried in Klembów, where his tomb remains beside the church. The estate stayed in the Żymirski family throughout the 19th century, managed by descendants including Józef and Władysław Żymirski, who oversaw further modernization of the property after fires during the January Uprising of 1863.

During the interwar period, the Żymirski family retained a reduced portion of the Klembów estate, with the manor remaining a local landmark and the family continuing to play an active role in parish and community life. Following the Second World War, the estate was nationalized under communist land reforms, and its buildings were repurposed for use as state farms, administrative offices, and later private residences.
