= Sitki, Masovian Voivodeship =

Sitki
- Village
- Location within Poland
- Coordinates: 52°25′09″N 21°19′54″E
- Country: Poland
- Voivodeship: Masovian
- County: Wołomin
- Gmina: Klembów

Sitki [ˈɕitki] is a village in the administrative district of Gmina Klembów, within Wołomin County, Masovian Voivodeship, in east-central Poland.
