= Krusze, Masovian Voivodeship =

Krusze
- Village
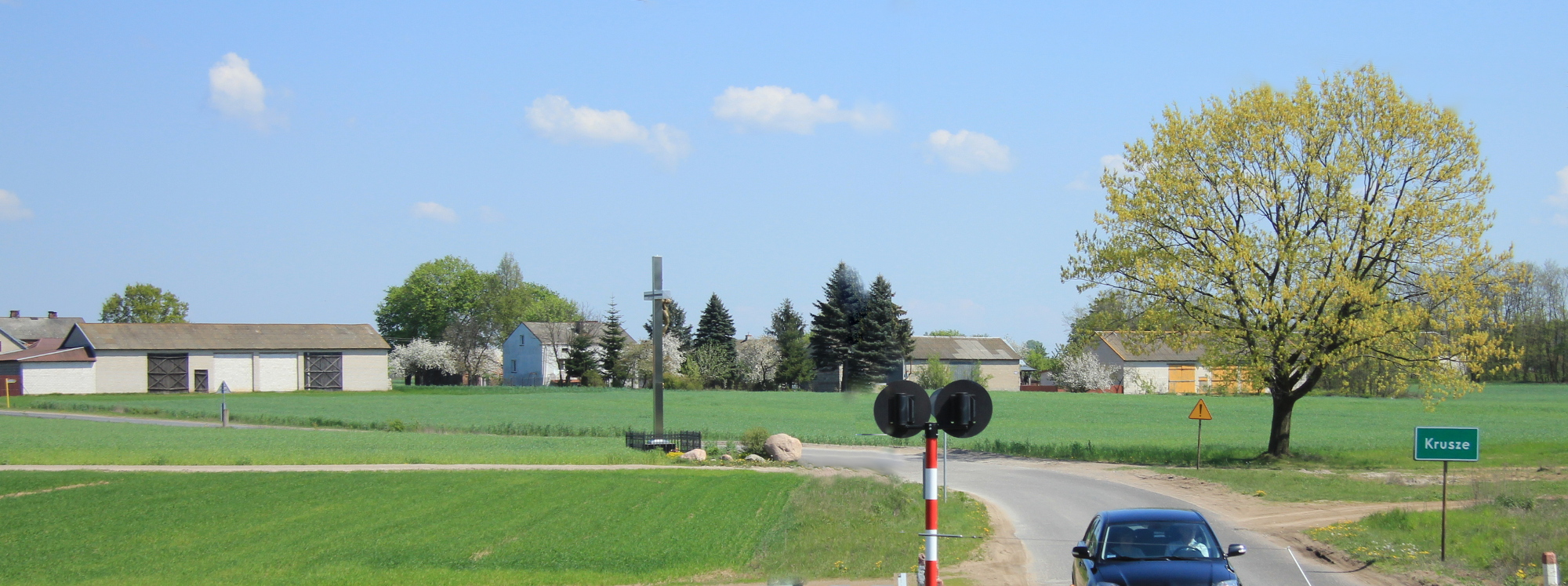

- Location within Poland
- Coordinates: 52°26′N 21°22′E
- Country: Poland
- Voivodeship: Masovian
- County: Wołomin
- Gmina: Klembów
- Time zone: UTC+1 (CET)
  - Summer (DST): UTC+2 (CEST)

Krusze [ˈkruʂɛ] is a village in the administrative district of Gmina Klembów, within Wołomin County, Masovian Voivodeship, in east-central Poland.

Eight Polish citizens were murdered by Nazi Germany in the village during World War II.
