= Night trains of Sweden =

Night trains of Sweden (Swedish: Nattåg) are over-night sleeping car services provided by three different operators across Sweden, one of these trains terminates in Narvik in Norway, and one runs from Stockholm to Berlin.

== Current services ==
=== SJ ===
SJ operates its night trains with a variety of service levels, they offer seats, couchettes (Swedish: Liggvagn), a bed in a sleeping compartment (Swedish: Sovvagn) or a private 1-class sleeping compartment with an en-suite shower and WC, not all service levels are available on all night trains. (Note: SJ was formerly SJ AB, a state-owned passenger train operator created from Statens Järnvägar, a former government agency.)

As of 2026, SJ operates night trains on the following routes:

- Stockholm to Östersund, Åre and Duved, outbound train 70 & train 71 return.
- Stockholm to Malmö, outbound train 1 & train 2 return.
- Stockholm Central to Umeå, outbound train 92 & train 91 return.
- Stockholm Central to Luleå, outbound train 94 & train 93 return.

RDC Deutschland operates a night train between Stockholm to Malmö, Hamburg and Berlin, outbound train EuroNight 345 & train EuroNight 346 return.

=== Snälltåget ===
Snälltåget operates a seasonal night train between Stockholm, Malmo, Copenhagen, Hamburg and Berlin, outbound 301 & train 300 return. (Note: Snälltåget is an open access railway company in Sweden owned by Transdev.) In 2024 it operates outbound daily except Saturday between 31 March and 1 November. On Fridays the journey is extended to Dresden. There are additional trips going to Dresden via Berlin on Wednesdays 27 November, 4 and 11 December. In each case the return journeys take place on the following day.

Snälltåget runs a seasonal night train from Malmö via Lund, Hässleholm, Alvesta, Nässjö, Linköping, Norrköping, Stockholm, and Uppsala, arriving the next morning in Östersund, Undersåker, Åre, Duved, Enafors, and Storlien, outbound train 3920 & train 3921 return, on Wednesday and Saturday evenings. The return journey takes place on Thursday and Sunday afternoons from the mountains. In 2024 this service is running between 19 June to 29 September 2024.

== History ==
Night trains were launched in 1873 when sleeping facilities were provided by convertible compartments with the first sleeping cars appeared in 1885, initially in four wheel coaches, bogie wagons were introduced by Statens Järnvägar in 1891.

Third class sleepers were introduced in 1910 with the first examples appearing on the Stockholm to Gothenburg service. From this time the sleeping compartments were standardised so that first-class passengers had single berth compartments (although sometimes a second-class compartment would be marked as first class and would only be for solo occupancy), double-berths compartments for second-class and three berths, one above the other in third class.

In 1955 sleeping coaches were provided from Stockholm to 24 domestic destinations every night and over a million sleeping car passengers were conveyed.

In April 2026, the Swedish government halved the night train service to Norrland and Lapland, trains 91 and 92 being cancelled between Umeå and Luleå, and trains 93 and 94 being cancelled between Boden and Narvik. Following an agreement between the Swedish government and SJ, night train service to Narvik is planned to resume in December 2026.

== Bibliography ==
- Greville, M.D. (December 1956). "A Century of Railway Development in Sweden". Railway Magazine. Vol. 102, no. 668. pp. 811–817.
- Hamilton Ellis, C. (October 1937). "The Railways of Sweden - Part 2". Railway Magazine. Vol. 81, no. 484. pp. 258–267.
