= Klembów =

- Village
- Location within Poland
- Coordinates: 52°24′N 21°19′E
- Country: Poland
- Voivodeship: Masovian
- County: Wołomin
- Gmina: Klembów
- Population: 920
- Website: http://www.klembow.pl

Klembów [ˈklɛmbuf] is a village in Wołomin County, Masovian Voivodeship, in east-central Poland. It is the seat of the gmina (administrative district) called Gmina Klembów.
