= Tłuszcz =

Town in Masovian Voivodeship, Poland

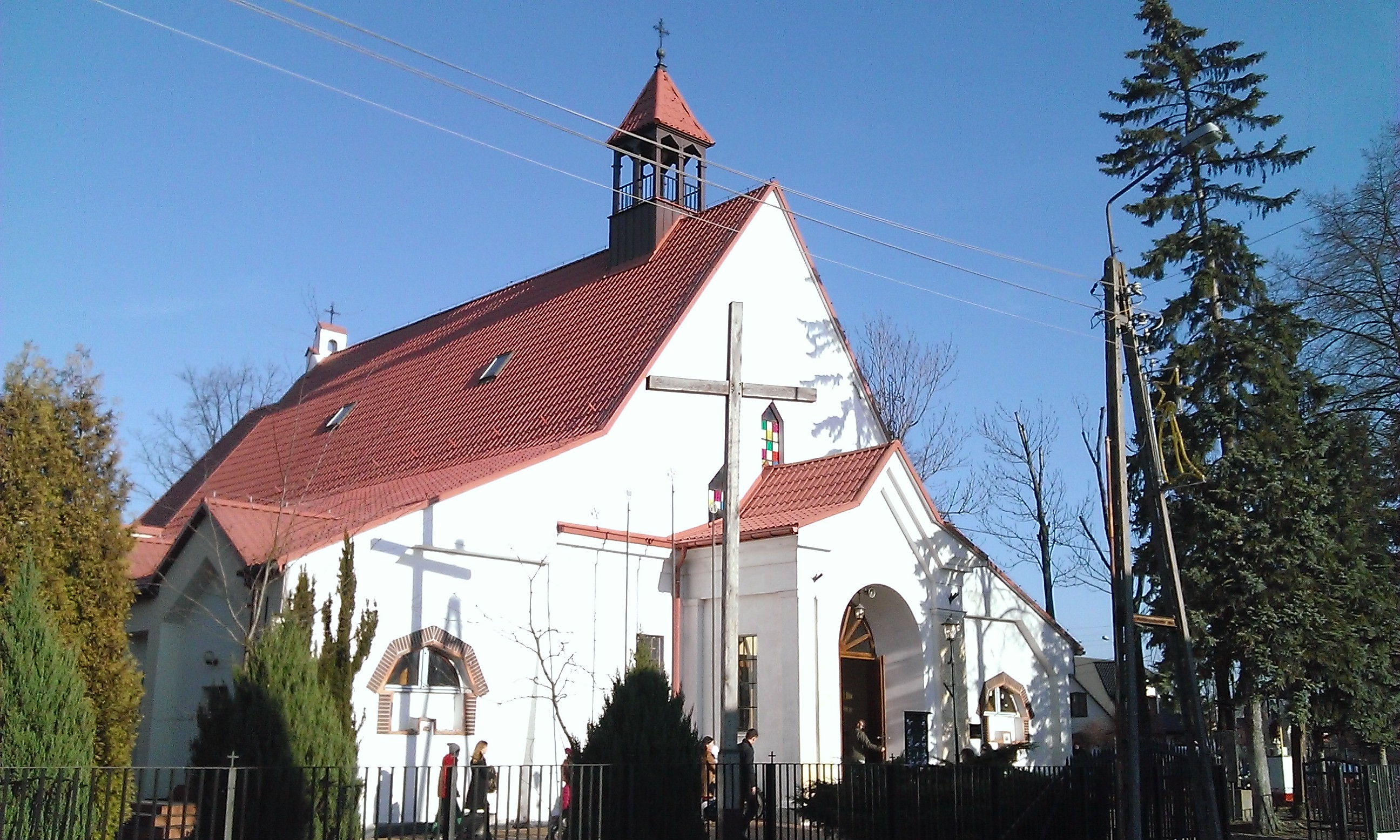
- Our Lady of Fatima Church in Tłuszcz

- Coat of arms

- Location within Poland
- Coordinates: 52°26′N 21°27′E
- Country: Poland
- Voivodeship: Masovian
- County: Wołomin
- Gmina: Tłuszcz
- Established: 15th century
- Town rights: 1967

Government
  - Mayor: Paweł Bednarczyk

Area
  - Total: 7.91 km^{2} (3.05 sq mi)
- Elevation: 110 m (360 ft)

Population (2014)
  - Total: 8,015
  - Density: 1,010/km^{2} (2,620/sq mi)
- Time zone: UTC+1 (CET)
  - Summer (DST): UTC+2 (CEST)
- Postal code: 05-240
- Area code: (+48) 29
- Car plates: WWL
- Website: http://www.tluszcz.pl

Tłuszcz [twuʂt͡ʂ] (translation: Fat) is a town in Wołomin County, Masovian Voivodeship, in east-central Poland, with 8,039 inhabitants (2021).

== History ==
Tłuszcz was founded in the 15th century. It was a royal village of Poland, administratively located in the Nur Land in the Masovian Voivodeship in the Greater Poland Province.

During the Polish–Soviet War, in the night of 12–13 August 1920, Tłuszcz was the scene of a skirmish between the Poles and the invading Russians, part of the Battle of Warsaw (1920).

Following the German-Soviet invasion of Poland, which started World War II in September 1939, it was occupied by Germany until 1944. Two Polish policemen from Tłuszcz were murdered by the Russians in the Katyn massacre in 1940. The German occupiers removed pockets of Jews from the town, shot and killed many of the same, and segregated various Jewish populations away from Tłuszcz town limits.

== Rail ==
The Tłuszcz railway station was established 1862. Modern stations on the line connect to multiple European destinations.
