= DSB class MR =

MR/MRD
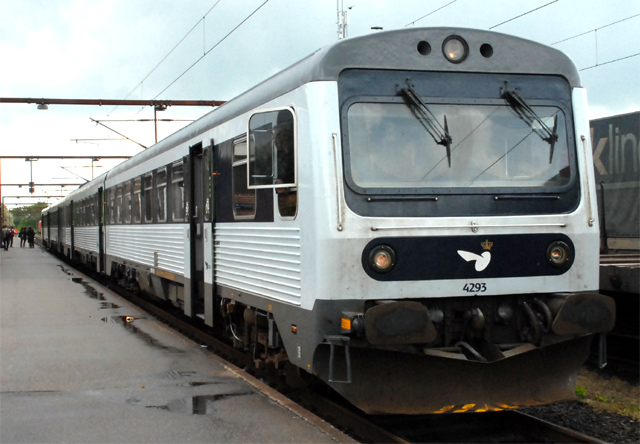
- DSB MR 4293 at Padborg station.

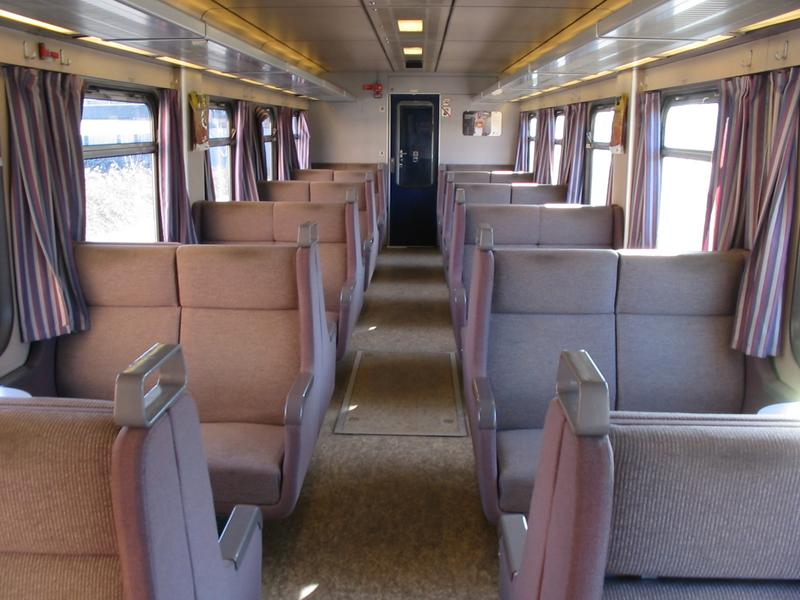
- Interior (2004).
- Manufacturers: Waggonfabrik Uerdingen; Scandia
- Constructed: 1978–1985 (MR); 1981–1985 (MRD)
- Number built: 98 (MR); 97 (MRD)
- Formation: MR + MR (original); MR + MRD (since 1981)
- Operators: DSB; Arriva

Specifications
- Train length: 44.670 m (146 ft 6 11/16 in)
- Car length: 22.335 m (73 ft 3 5/16 in)
- Wheel diameter: 760 mm (2 ft 5 15/16 in)
- Maximum speed: 120 km/h (75 mph); 130 km/h (81 mph) (since 1996)
- Weight: 34.5 t + 34.5 t
- Prime mover: Deutz F12L 413F
- Engine type: V-12 diesel
- Cylinder count: 12
- Cylinder size: 120 mm × 130 mm (4.7 in × 5.1 in)
- Power output: 410 hp (310 kW) (per car, original); 325 hp (242 kW) (per car, without turbo)
- Transmission: hydraulic, Voith 320
- UIC classification: 2′B′+B′2′
- Coupling system: Screw coupling
- Track gauge: 1,435 mm (4 ft 8 1/2 in)

The class MR and class MRD are classes of diesel multiple units (DMUs) built for the Danish State Railways (DSB). Delivered between 1978 and 1985, they have seen use primarily in regional passenger service. A total of 97 trainsets were built, initially by Waggonfabrik Uerdingen and later Scandia.

== Design ==
The class MR is an adaptation of the German class 628.0 and was first delivered in 1978. The trains were initially coupled as MR–MR carriages back-to-back. Starting in 1981, the class MRD was introduced to better accommodate passengers' luggage, and from then on the MR–MRD formation has been used. The trainsets can run in multiple, with up to five carriage pairs in a train having been used.

== History ==
In 2003, Arriva took over operation of several branch lines in Jutland from DSB, and for this purpose rented 39 MR–MRD trainsets from DSB. 24 of these trains were returned to DSB in 2004–2005, and the remaining 15 in 2010. In addition, 13 MR–MRD trainsets were sold to Arriva in Poland in 2007–08. As of 2016, many of the MR/MRDs have been retired, while two trainsets are preserved by the Danish Railway Museum.

== Bibliography ==
- Lauritsen, Tom (1997). Danske lokomotiver og motorvogne 1997 (in Danish). Frank Stenvalls Förlag. ISBN 91-7266-141-0.
- Poulsen, John (2016). MotorMateriel 4.2: Letbyggede motortog fra Uerdingen/Duewag (in Danish). Bane Bøger. ISBN 97887-91434-45-7.
