= Yangsanjungang station =

Railway station in South Korea

Yangsanjungang (Sports Complex) station (Korean: 양산중앙(종합운동장)역) is an under-construction railway station on Busan Metro Line 2 and Yangsan Metro of the Busan Metro system.
