= Aura Airlines =

Spanish airline, 2021–2022

IATA	ICAO	Call sign
U5	GWR	LEMON
- Founded: 2017
- Commenced operations: January 2021
- Ceased operations: October 27, 2022
- Operating bases: Adolfo Suárez Madrid–Barajas Airport
- Fleet size: 3
- Parent company: JMB Aviation Group
- Website: www.auraairlines.com

Aura Airlines SL (previously Gowair Vacation Airlines) was a Spanish airline based at Adolfo Suárez Madrid–Barajas Airport.

== History ==
Previously owned by tour operator Gowair, it operated charter flights in Europe and offered ACMI leases to other airlines. The company received its first aircraft, an Airbus A320-200, in July 2017. It planned to start flights to the Caribbean using an Airbus A330 in 2018, however by 2020 the company had not begun operation of any aircraft.

Aura Airlines ceased operations on October 27, 2022.

== Fleet ==
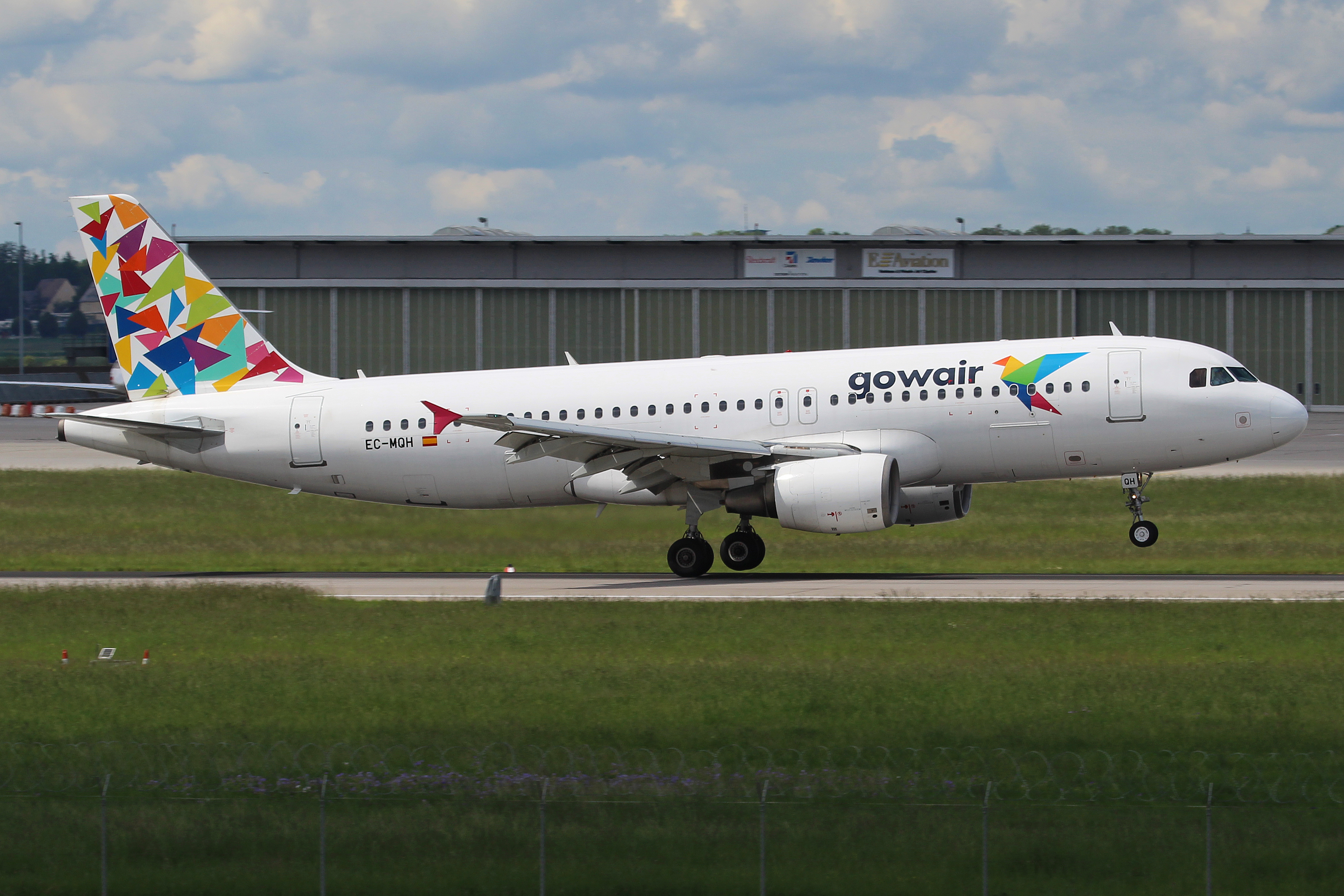
A former Gowair Airbus A320-200 landing at Stuttgart Airport in 2019

By January 2022, Aura Airlines operated the following aircraft:

Aura Airlines fleet
Aircraft	In service	Orders	Passengers	Notes
Airbus A320-200	2	—	180	
Airbus A330-200	1	—	TBA	
Total	3	—		

== See also ==
- List of airlines of Spain
