= Graswurzelrevolution =

Anarcho-pacifist magazine

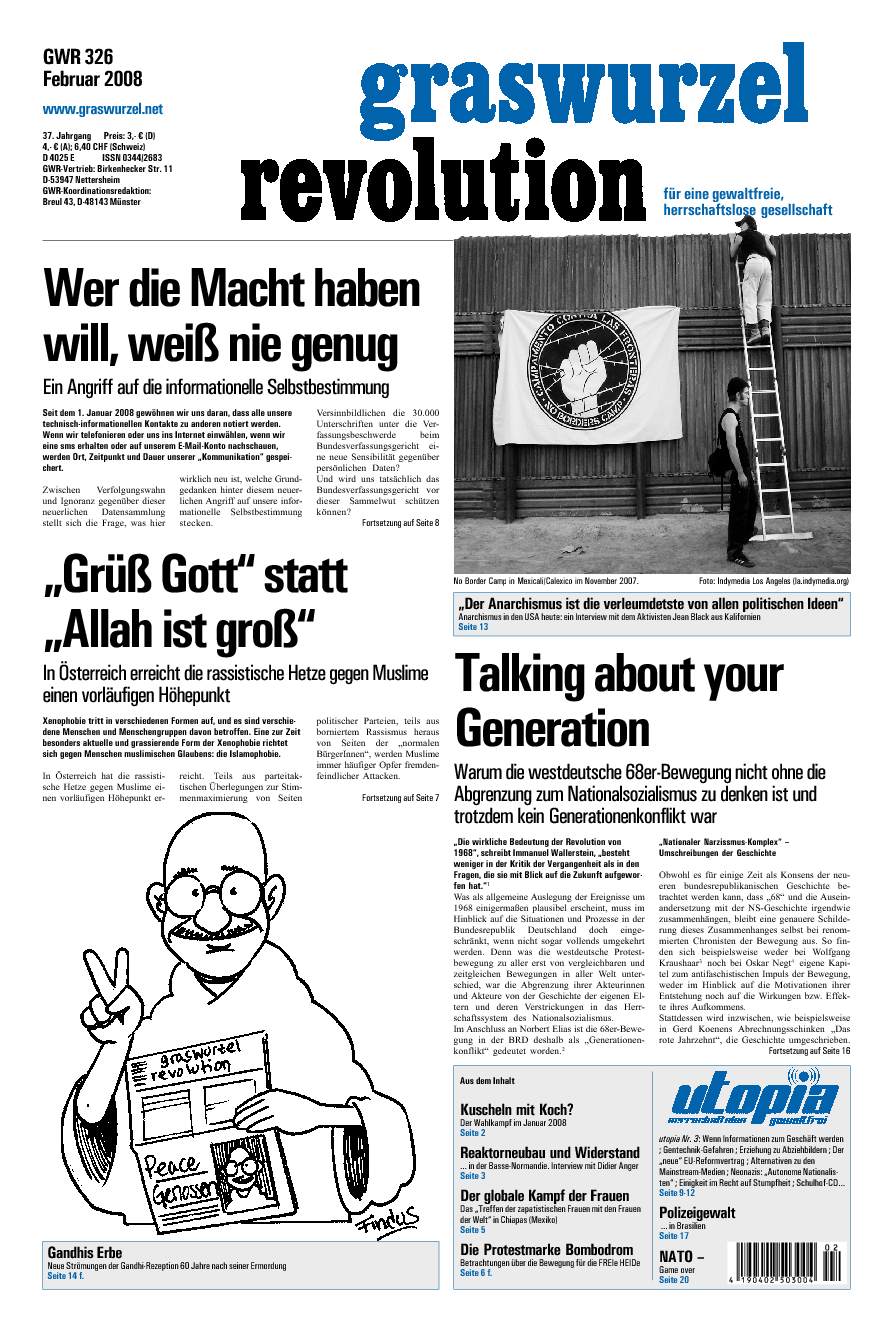
Graswurzelrevolution

Graswurzelrevolution (English: Grassroots Revolution) is an anarcho-pacifist magazine founded in 1972 by Wolfgang Hertle in West Germany. It focuses on social equality, anti-militarism and ecology. The magazine is considered the most influential and long-lived anarchist publication of the German post-war period. It is classified by the Verfassungsschutz as left-wing extremist.

According to social scientist Ralf Vandamme, Graswurzelrevolution is "the main voice of the grassroots democratic activists."

"The group that has most consistently tried to build a social rhizome and comes closest to anarchist ethics is the so-called Non-violent Action. It is not by coincidence that this group's newspaper, a magazine with a relatively wide distribution, is called graswurzelrevolution." — Horst Stowasser

The zero issue of Graswurzelrevolution (GWR) [Grassroots Revolution] was published in the summer of 1972 in Augsburg, Bavaria. The "monthly magazine for a non-violent, anarchist society" was inspired by Peace News (published since 1936 by War Resisters' International (WRI) in London), the German-speaking Direkte Aktion (Newspaper for Anarchism and Non-Violence; published from 1965 to 1966 by Wolfgang Zucht and other non-violent activists in Hanover) and the French-speaking Anarchisme et Nonviolence (published in Switzerland and France from 1964 to 1973).

Distributed throughout Germany, the paper describes itself as follows:

graswurzelrevolution means a fundamental social revolution which intends to abolish all forms of violence and domination by building up power from below. We fight for a world which no longer discriminates against people on the grounds of their gender or sexual orientation, their language, origin, convictions, disabilities, or based on racist or anti-Semitic prejudice. Our aim is to replace hierarchies and capitalism by a self-organized, socialist economic order and to replace the state by a federalist and grassroots democratic society. Up to now, our work has been focussed on anti-militarist and ecological areas. As far as possible, our aims should be reflected and applied in our forms of struggle and organisation. In order to drive back and destroy structures of domination and violence, we use non-violent forms of action. This is the way in which the anarchist paper graswurzelrevolution, since 1972, has been striving to broaden and develop the theory and practice of non-violent revolution.

1999/2000: The coordinating editors of the publication Graswurzelrevolution No. 239 (April 1999) are the subjects of a criminal investigation according to § 111 of the Criminal Code, along with ninety persons who signed an appeal to boycott and desert the war in Yugoslavia. The GWR had already been investigated multiple times for the incitation of direct actions – e.g. for the article printed in GWR No. 110 (Dec. 1986) entitled "When the Utility Pole Falls… - Reflections upon Sabotage as a Direct, Non-Violent Action".

It is the newspaper's declared aim to point out the connection between non-violence and anarchism and to contribute to "the pacifist movement becoming libertarian socialist and the anarchist movement becoming non-violent in their form of fighting". Since GWR No.52/1981 the periodical has been published monthly with a break in summer from July to August. Before that it came out every two to three months. Since 1989 it has come with an eight-page supplement of "libertarian book pages" every October. It has been published by different editors in Augsburg (1972–1973), Berlin (1974–1976), Göttingen (1976–1978), Hamburg (1978–1988), Heidelberg (1988–1992), Wustrow (1992–1995), Oldenburg (1995–1999) and Münster (since the beginning of 1999). The sociologist Bernd Drücke is the coordinating editor since 1999. In the process the different editorial collectives each determined their own style. 2025 is GWR's 54st year of publication, with circulations between 3,000 and 5,000 copies.
