= Koziki, Podlaskie Voivodeship =

Koziki
- Village
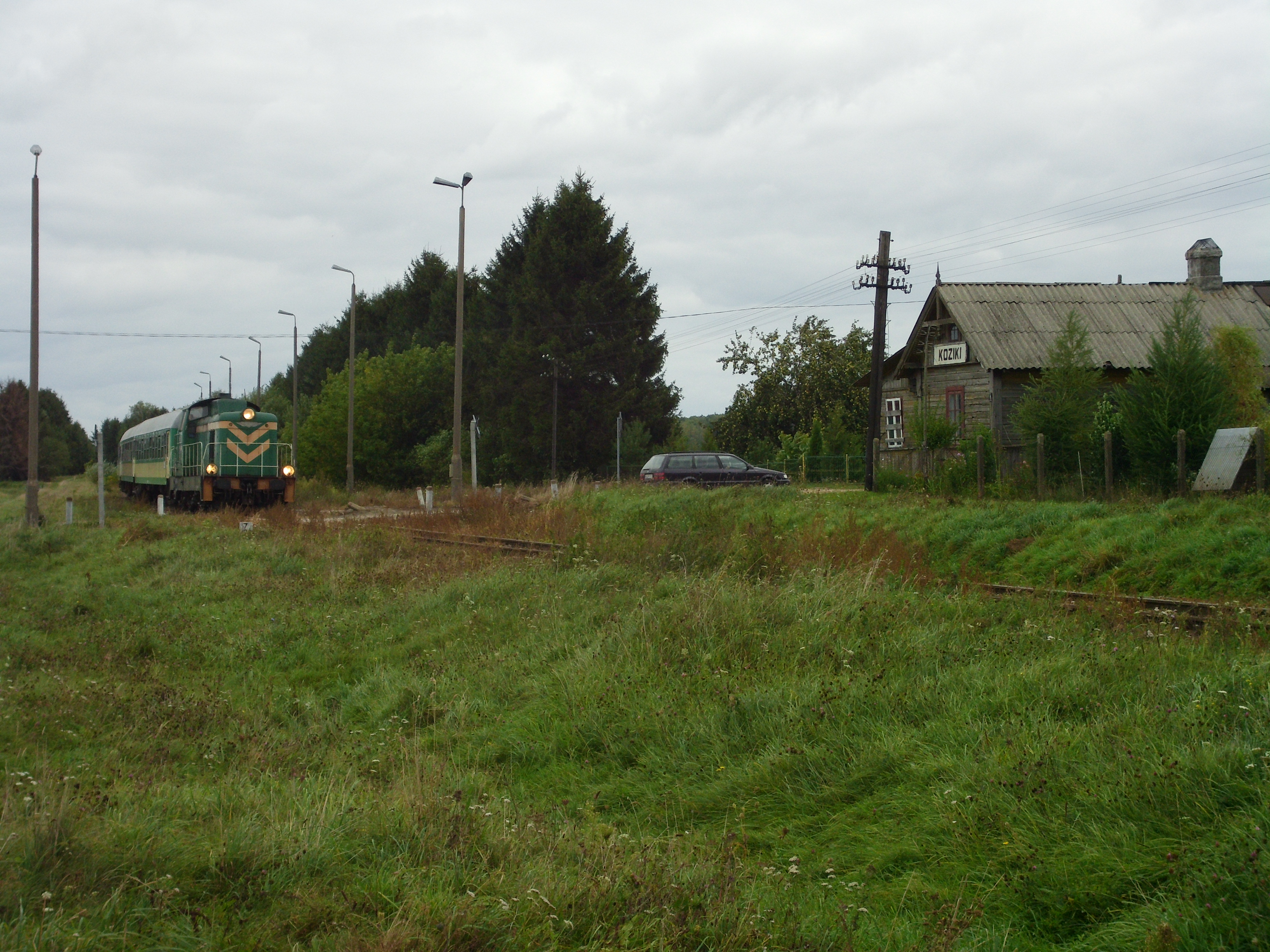
- Train stop in Koziki

- Location within Poland
- Coordinates: 53°5′48″N 22°2′25″E
- Country: Poland
- Voivodeship: Podlaskie
- County: Łomża
- Gmina: Śniadowo

Population
  - Total: 240
- Time zone: UTC+1 (CET)
  - Summer (DST): UTC+2 (CEST)
- Postal code: 18-411
- Vehicle registration: BLM

Koziki [kɔˈʑiki] is a village in the administrative district of Gmina Śniadowo, within Łomża County, Podlaskie Voivodeship, in north-eastern Poland.

Koziki-Wądołowo was a private village of Polish nobility, administratively located in the Łomża County in the Masovian Voivodeship in the Greater Poland Province of the Kingdom of Poland.
