= Michałów-Reginów =

- Village
- Location within Poland
- Coordinates: 52°25′16″N 20°58′18″E
- Country: Poland
- Voivodeship: Masovian
- County: Legionowo
- Gmina: Wieliszew
- Population: 1,318

Michałów-Reginów [miˈxawuf rɛˈɡinuf] is a village in the administrative district of Gmina Wieliszew, within Legionowo County, Masovian Voivodeship, in east-central Poland.
