= Tłuszcz railway station =

Railway station in Tłuszcz, Poland

Tłuszcz
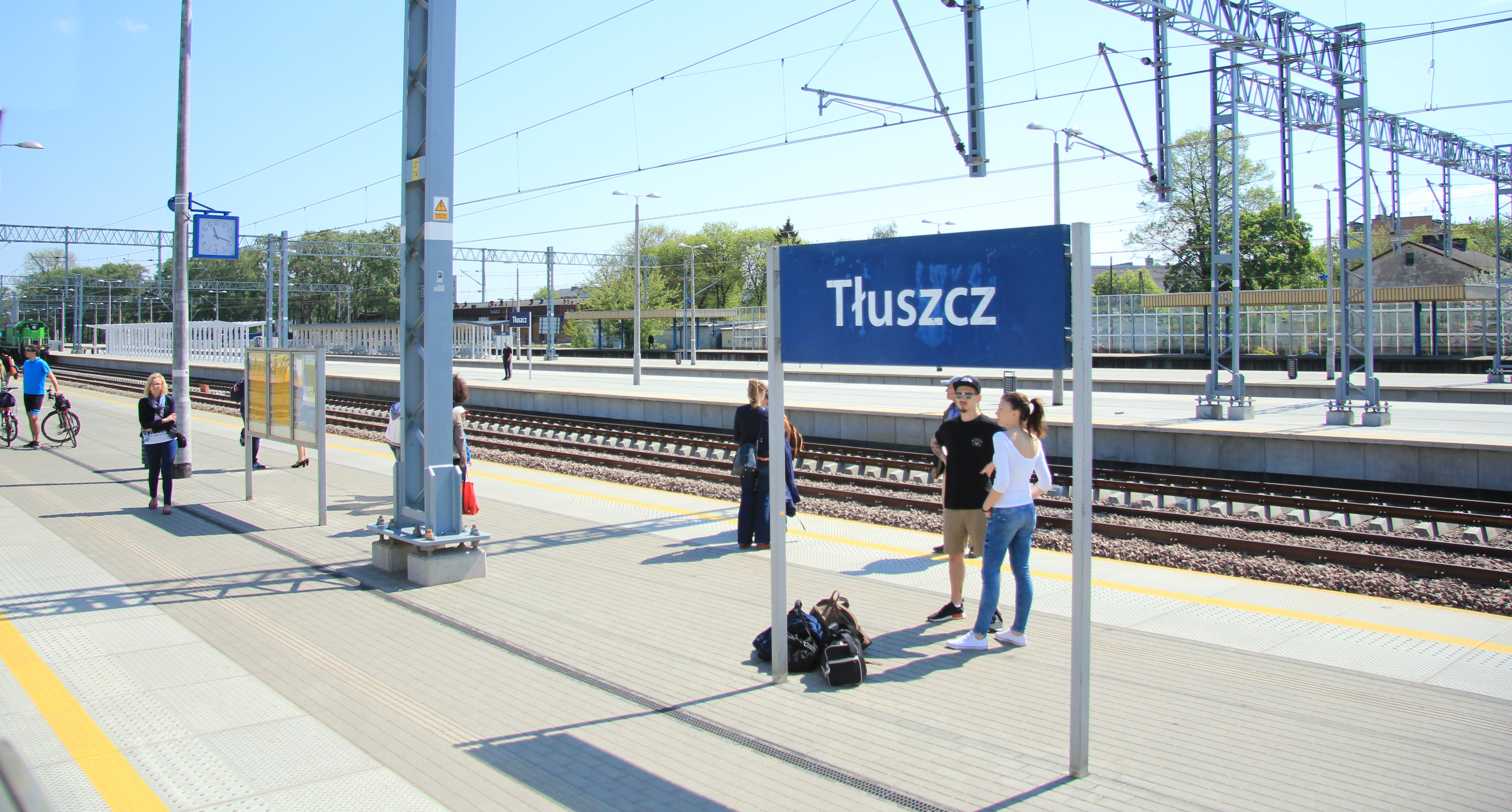

General information
- Location: Tłuszcz, Masovian; Poland
- Coordinates: 52°25′51″N 21°26′06″E
- System: B
- Owner: Polskie Koleje Państwowe S.A.
- Platforms: 5
- Tracks: 8

Construction
- Structure type: Building: Yes

History
- Opened: 1862

Services
Preceding station	Masovian Railways	Following station
Jasienica Mazowiecka towards Warszawa Zachodnia	R6	Chrzęsne towards Czyżew
Jasienica Mazowiecka towards Warszawa Wileńska	R60	Chrzęsne towards Czyżew
Terminus	R61	Jarzębia Łąka towards Ostrołęka
Krusze towards Legionowo	R92	Terminus
Location

Tłuszcz railway station is a railway station serving Tłuszcz in Masovian Voivodeship, Poland. It is served by Masovian Railways, who run services from Warszawa Zachodnia (or Warszawa Wileńska) to Małkinia and from Tłuszcz to Ostrołęka. It is also served by Polregio and PKP Intercity. The station was opened in 1862.

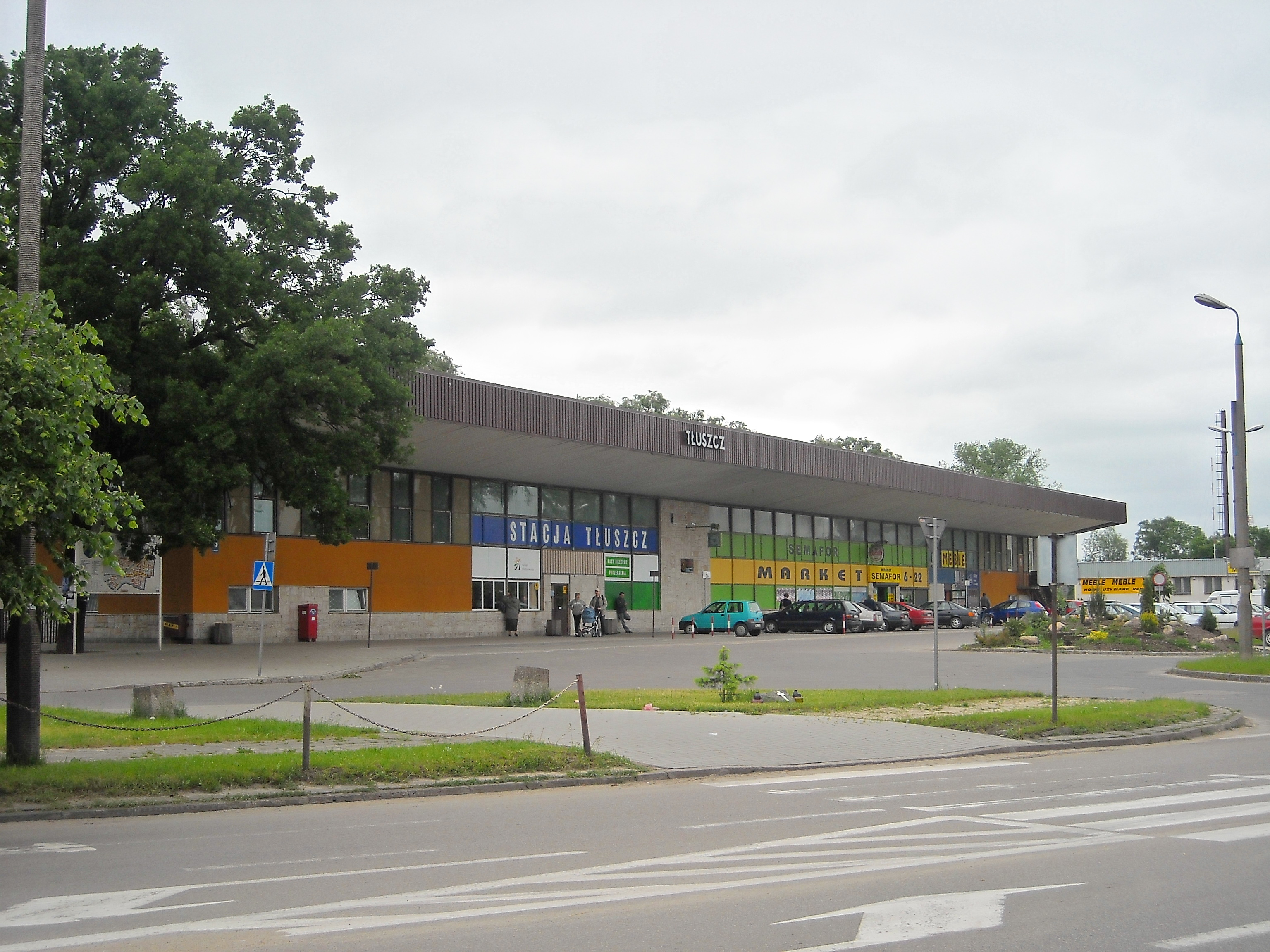
Station building (to 2024)
