= Great Western Railway (2026) =

Future state-owned British train operating company

Overview
- Main regions: Greater London; South East England; South West England; South Wales
- Parent company: DfT Operator
- Reporting mark: GW
- Predecessor: Great Western Railway (FirstGroup)

Greater Western Railway Limited, trading as Great Western Railway (GWR) is a future state-owned British train operating company that is scheduled take over the services of the operator of the same name from FirstGroup on 13 December 2026.

== History ==
In the lead up to the 2024 United Kingdom general election, the Labour Party of Keir Starmer committed itself to bringing the passenger operations of the British rail network back under state ownership. After winning that election, the government introduced the Passenger Railway Services (Public Ownership) Act 2024, and this received royal assent in November 2024.

In May 2026, the Department for Transport announced that FirstGroup-owned Great Western Railway's contract would end and the new company, owned by DfT Operator, is scheduled to take over on 13 December 2026.
