= Xi'an East railway station =

Railway station in Xi'an, China

Xi'andong 西安东
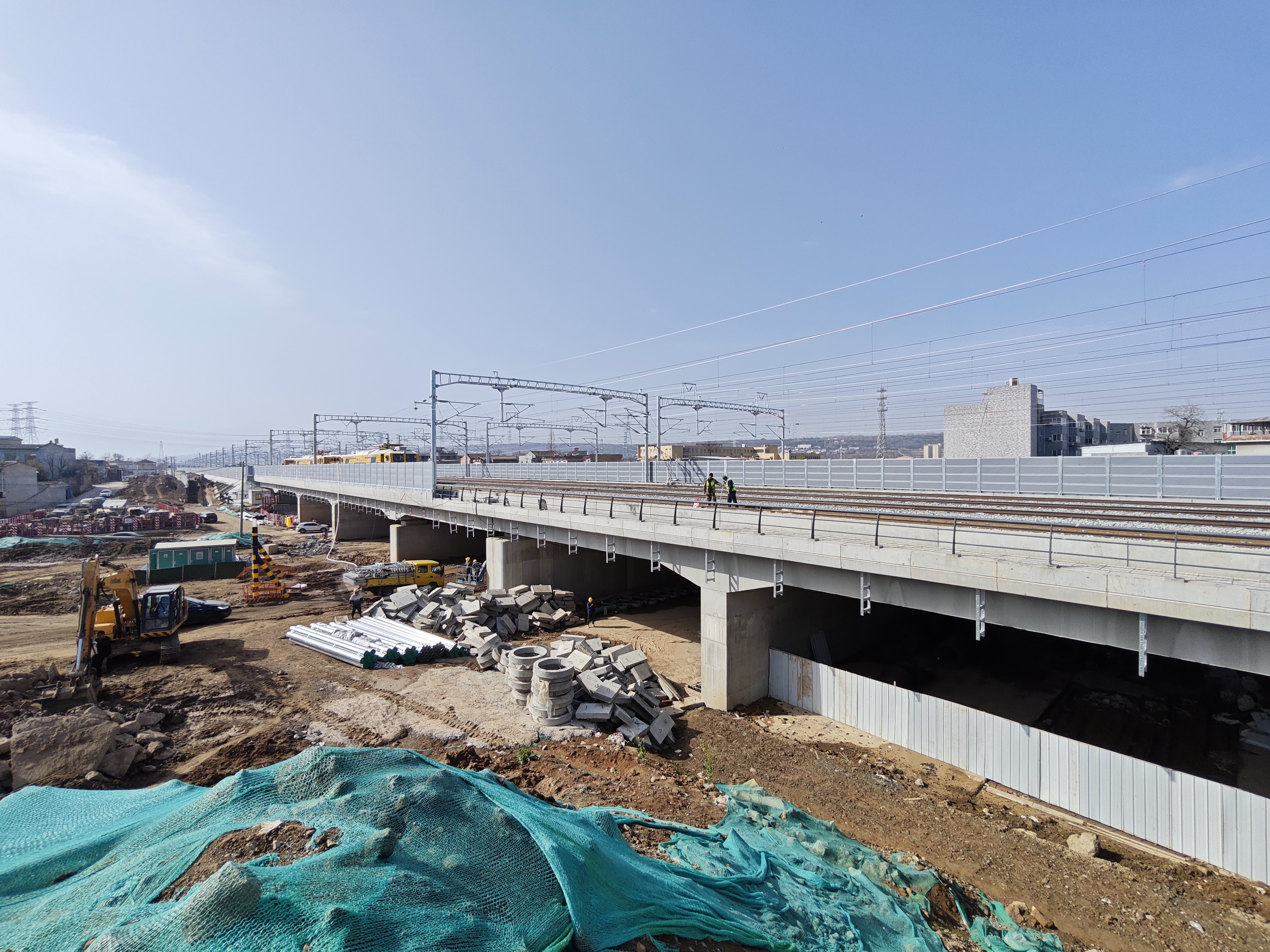
- Construction site

Chinese name
- Simplified Chinese: 西安东站
- Traditional Chinese: 西安東站
Transcriptions
Standard Mandarin
- Hanyu Pinyin: Xīāndōng Zhàn

General information
- Location: Wanzi village (湾子村); Baqiao District, Xi'an, Shaanxi; China
- Coordinates: 34°12′56″N 109°03′32″E
- Operator: China Railway Xi'an Group
- Lines: Xi'an–Ankang railway; Wuhan–Xi'an high-speed railway; Xi'an–Yan'an high-speed railway; Xi'an–Chongqing high-speed railway (U/C)
- Platforms: 21 (10 island and 1 side)
- Tracks: 23
- Connections: Xi'andongzhan

History
- Opened: 30 June 2026
- Former names: Fangzhicheng
Location

Xi'an East railway station (Chinese: 西安东站) is a railway station in Baqiao, Xi'an, Shaanxi, China. It is on the Xi'an–Ankang railway, Wuhan–Xi'an high-speed railway, Xi'an–Yan'an high-speed railway and Xi'an–Chongqing high-speed railway. It was put into operation on 30 June 2026. The total area is 394,000 m^{2} (4,240,000 sq ft), and the station has 11 platforms and 23 tracks (17 platforms and 35 tracks in the long term). It was built on the site of the original Fangzhicheng Station.

== History ==
On 30 November 2022, the Xi'an East Station construction project officially started.

On 9 May 2023, the station building construction officially started.

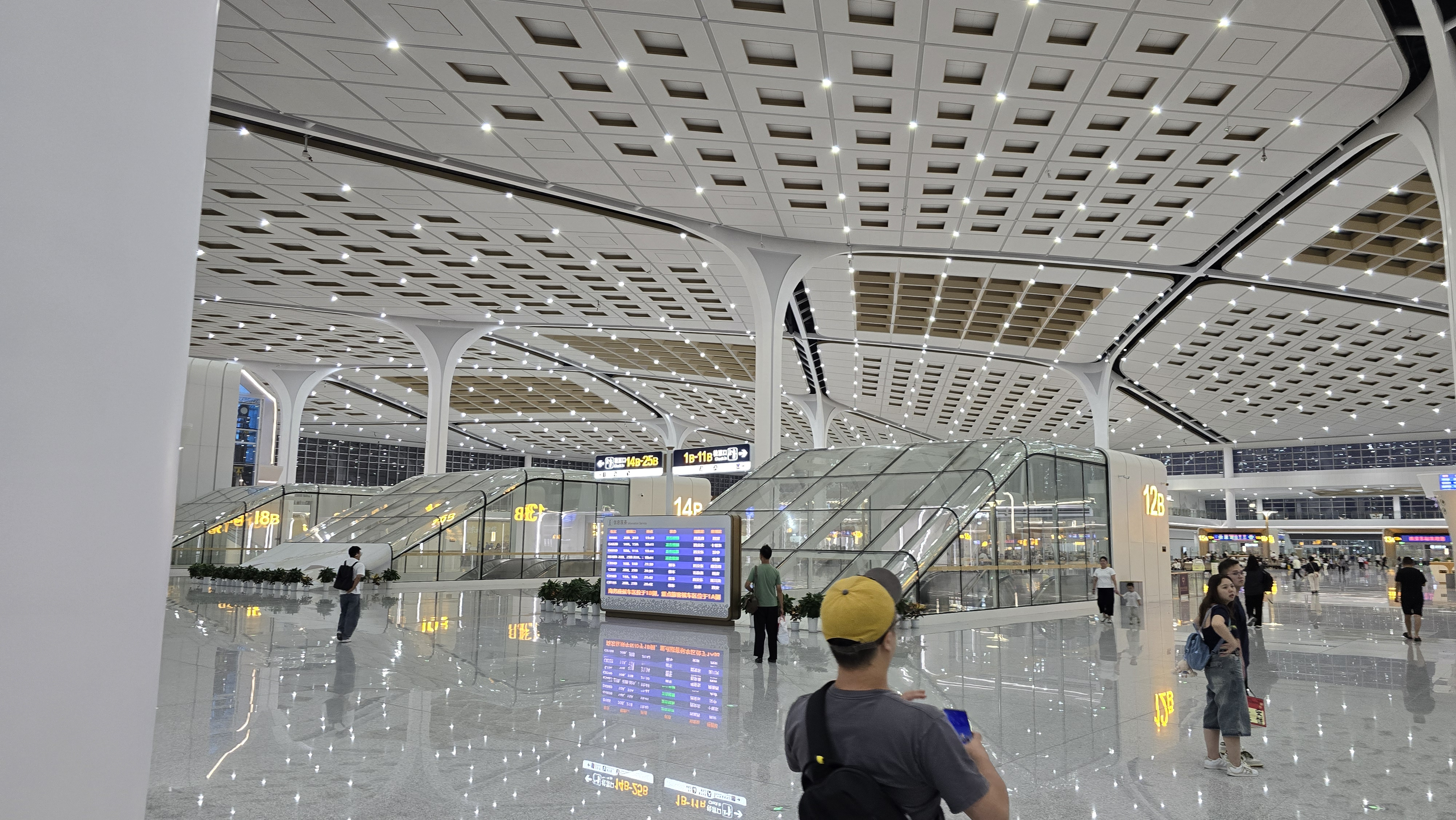
Interior of the Xiandong Train Station

On 30 June 2026, Xi'an East Railway Station was put into use simultaneously with the Wuhan-Xi'an HSR.

== Metro station ==
Xi'an Dongzhan 西安东站
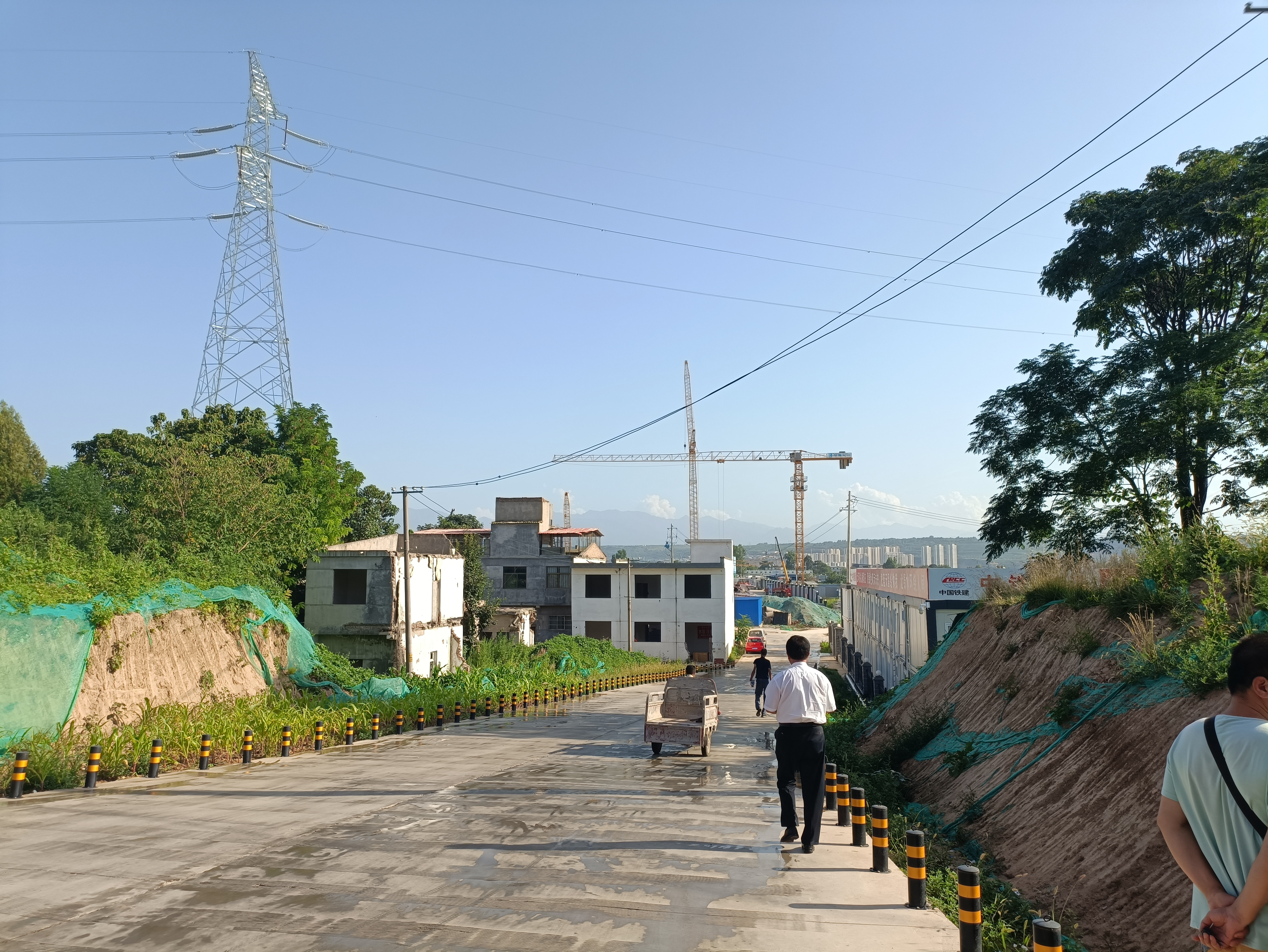
- Construction site

General information
- Location: Xi'an East railway station Baqiao District, Xi'an, Shaanxi; China
- Coordinates: 34°12′54″N 109°03′27″E
- System: Xi'an Metro
- Line: Line 5
- Platforms: 4 (2 island platforms)
- Tracks: 4

Construction
- Structure type: Underground
- Accessible: Yes

History
- Opened: 30 June 2026

Services
Preceding station	Xi'an Metro	Following station
Yanminghu towards Chuangxingang	Line 5	Terminus
Location

Xi'an East Station plans to build a supporting bus hub. Meanwhile, Metro Line 5 will also have a metro station at the new Xi'an East station (Xi'andongzhan), which will allow passengers to go to Chuangxingang station and other stations along the way, and transfer to other lines.
