= Ostrołęka railway station =

Railway station in Ostrołęka, Poland

Ostrołęka
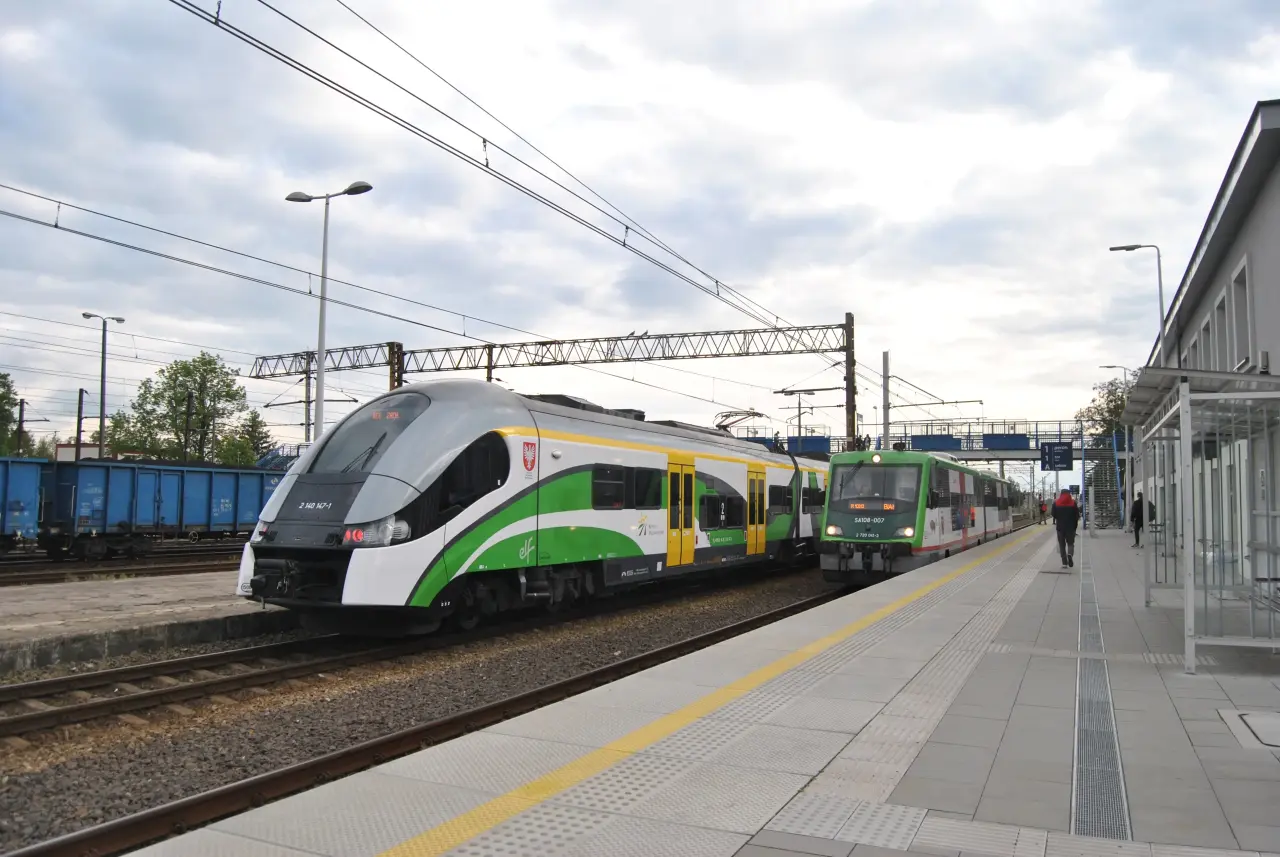

General information
- Location: Ostrołęka, Masovian; Poland
- Coordinates: 53°03′23″N 21°37′01″E
- Owner: Polskie Koleje Państwowe S.A.
- Platforms: 2
- Tracks: 4

Construction
- Structure type: Building: Yes

History
- Opened: 1893

Services
Preceding station	PKP Intercity	Following station
Chorzele towards Olsztyn Główny	IC	Śniadowo towards Białystok
Preceding station	Polregio	Following station
Terminus	PR	Śniadowo towards Białystok
Terminus	PR	Grabowo towards Olsztyn Główny
Preceding station	Masovian Railways	Following station
Terminus	R6	Pasieki towards Warszawa Zachodnia
Terminus	R61	Gierwaty towards Tłuszcz
Terminus	R62	Grabowo towards Chorzele
Terminus	R62	Grabowo towards Szczytno
Location
- Location within Masovian Voivodeship Location within Poland Location within Europe

Ostrołęka railway station is a railway station in Ostrołęka, Poland. It is served by Masovian Railways, who run the KM61 services from Ostrołęka to Tłuszcz, with some services continuing as KM6 services to Warsaw and Polregio, who run services to Olsztyn, Łomża and Białystok. Since 2023, Masovian Railways has been operating the KM62 services from Ostrołęka to Chorzele (or Szczytno, depending on the schedule).

In March 2024, passenger rail services between Ostrołęka and Białystok were restored (two train pairs), and in December 2024, direct passenger rail services between Ostrołęka and Olsztyn (one pair) and between Ostrołęka and Szczytno (two pairs) were also introduced.

All rail services to Tłuszcz are coordinated with services from Warszawa Wileńska, enabling convenient interchanges.

Additionally, on June 14, 2026, PKP Intercity joined the station's operators by launching services on the Białystok – Olsztyn route. This marked the return of long-distance trains to Ostrołęka after a 30-year hiatus.

== History ==
The history of rail transport in Ostrołęka dates back to 1893, when a railway connection to Małkinia and Łapy was opened, providing indirect links to Warsaw and Białystok. At present, four railway lines run through the city (Ostrołęka–Szczytno, Ostrołęka-Tłuszcz, Ostrołęka–Łapy and Ostrołęka–Małkinia). The railway line connecting Ostrołęka with Ostrów Mazowiecka and Małkinia Górna was closed in 1993 and remains the only line in Ostrołęka that is closed to passenger traffic. Railway connecting Ostrołęka with Szczytno, has been in operation since March 2023 on the section to Chorzele (serving passenger traffic on this route from that time only on this section), and since December 2023 has been operational along the entire length of the line. In addition, the city is served by railway line to Łapy, with a branch line to Białystok, and railway line from Tłuszcz to Ostrołęka. This line includes 16 stations.

It is planned to launch a long-distance service served by PKP Intercity to Gdynia and Łomża via Ostrołęka in the future.
