= Wieliszew =

- Village
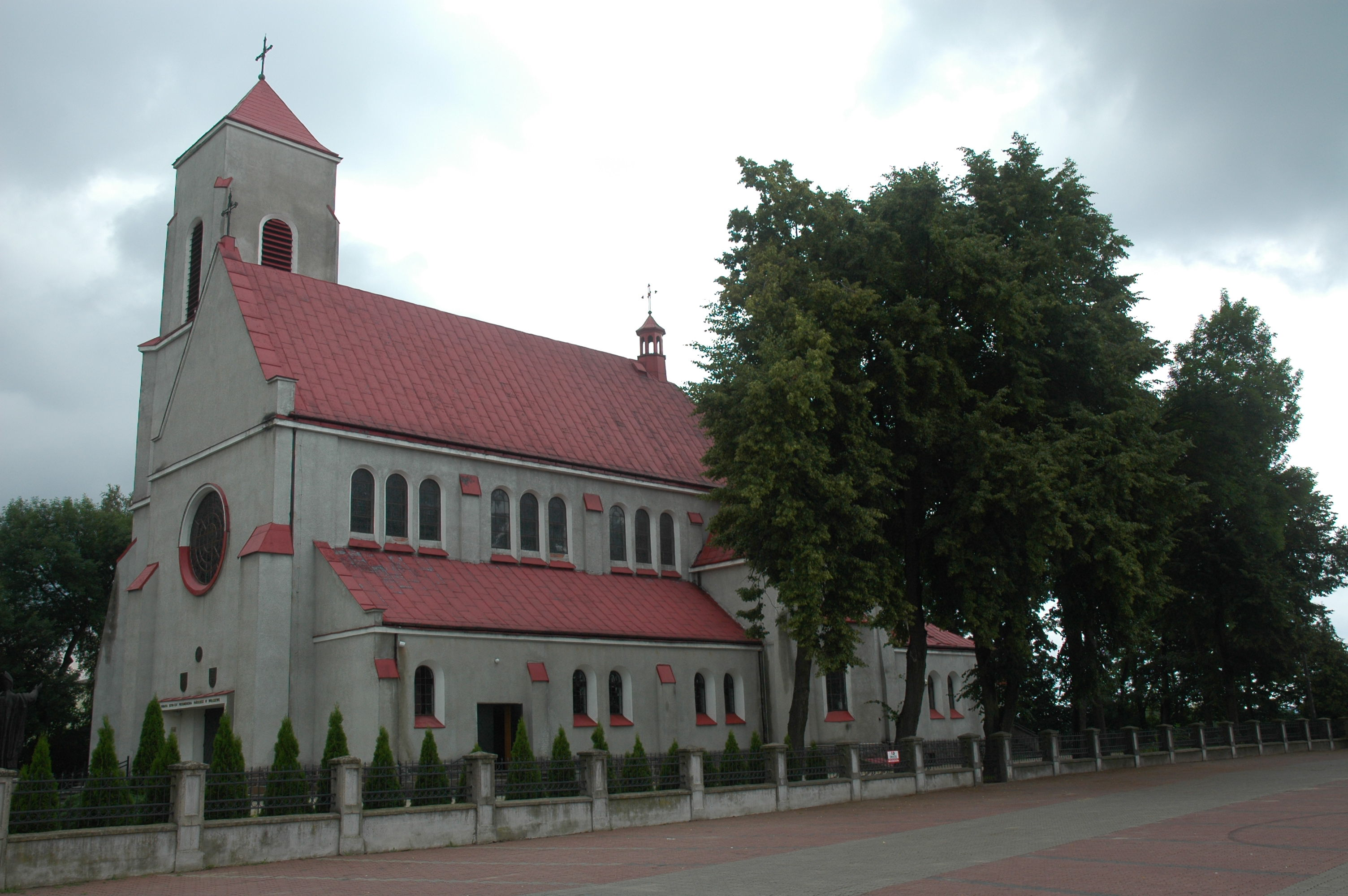
- Parish church of the Transfiguration

- Flag Coat of arms

- Location within Poland
- Coordinates: 52°27′N 20°58′E
- Country: Poland
- Voivodeship: Masovian
- County: Legionowo
- Gmina: Wieliszew
- Population: 3,122
- Website: http://www.wieliszew.pl

Wieliszew [vjɛˈliʂɛf] is a village in Legionowo County, Masovian Voivodeship, in east-central Poland, in the bifurcation of the Vistula and Narew Rivers. It is the seat of the gmina (commune or municipality as administrative district) called Gmina Wieliszew.

Wieliszew borders on the following villages: Skrzeszew and Komornica in the west, Izbica, Jachranka and Skubianka (via Jezioro Zegrzyńskie) (Lake Zegrzyńskie) in the north, Zegrze Południowe and Nieporęt in the east, and Łajski and Michałów-Reginów in the south. In the north, the village has a natural boundary, formed by the Narew River and Jezioro Zegrzyńskie of an area of approx. 700 ha, which was created as a result of damming the waters of the Bug River and Narew Rivers in Dębe and made available for general use in 1963.

The village and commune with its large forests, numerous natural monuments, meadows, and ponds (which are located within the zone of the Warsaw Protected Landscape Area) located near the capital, provides excellent holiday and recreation conditions.
