= Dąbkowizna railway station =

Railway station in Wólka Radzymińska, Poland

Dąbkowizna
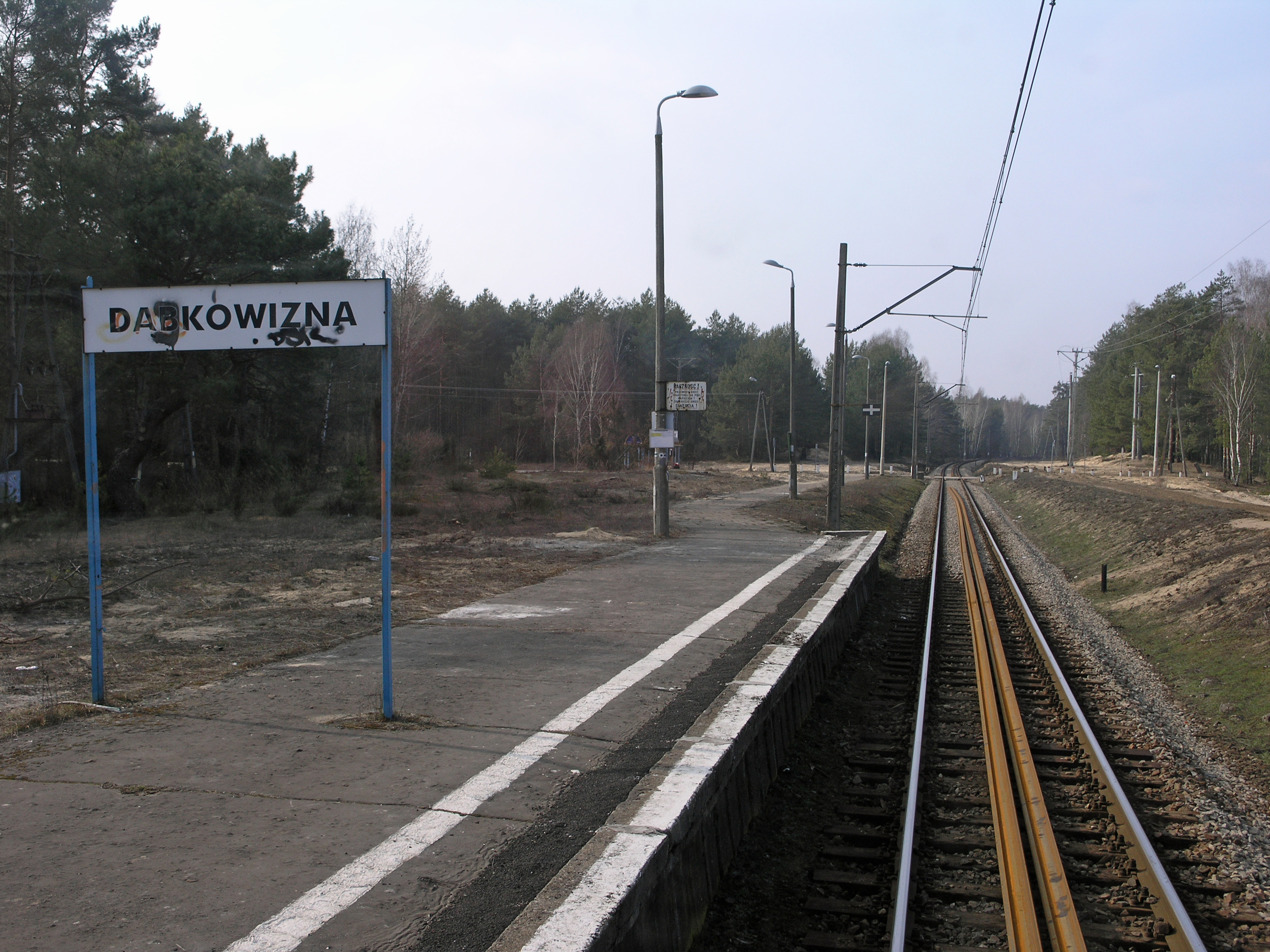

General information
- Location: Wólka Radzymińska, Nieporęt, Legionowo, Masovian; Poland
- Coordinates: 52°25′26″N 21°05′05″E
- System: Rail Station
- Owner: Polskie Koleje Państwowe S.A.

Services
Preceding station	Masovian Railways	Following station
Nieporęt towards Legionowo	R92	Radzymin towards Tłuszcz
Preceding station	SKM Warsaw	Following station
Nieporęt towards Piaseczno	S40	Radzymin Terminus
Location

Dąbkowizna railway station is a railway station in Wólka Radzymińska, Legionowo, Poland. It is served by Masovian Railways.

== History ==
Dąbkowizna is a former village in the vicinity of Nieporęt in Masovian Voivodeship in central Poland. Located on the Legionowo-Tłuszcz railway, right to the north of Wólka Radzymińska, the village was abandoned some time before World War II. During the war two bunkers were built along the railway by the Wehrmacht as part of their planned Festung Warschau. Currently the name is used only by a forester's estate and a PKP single-platform train station.
