= Nieporęt railway station =

Railway station in Nieporęt, Poland

Nieporęt
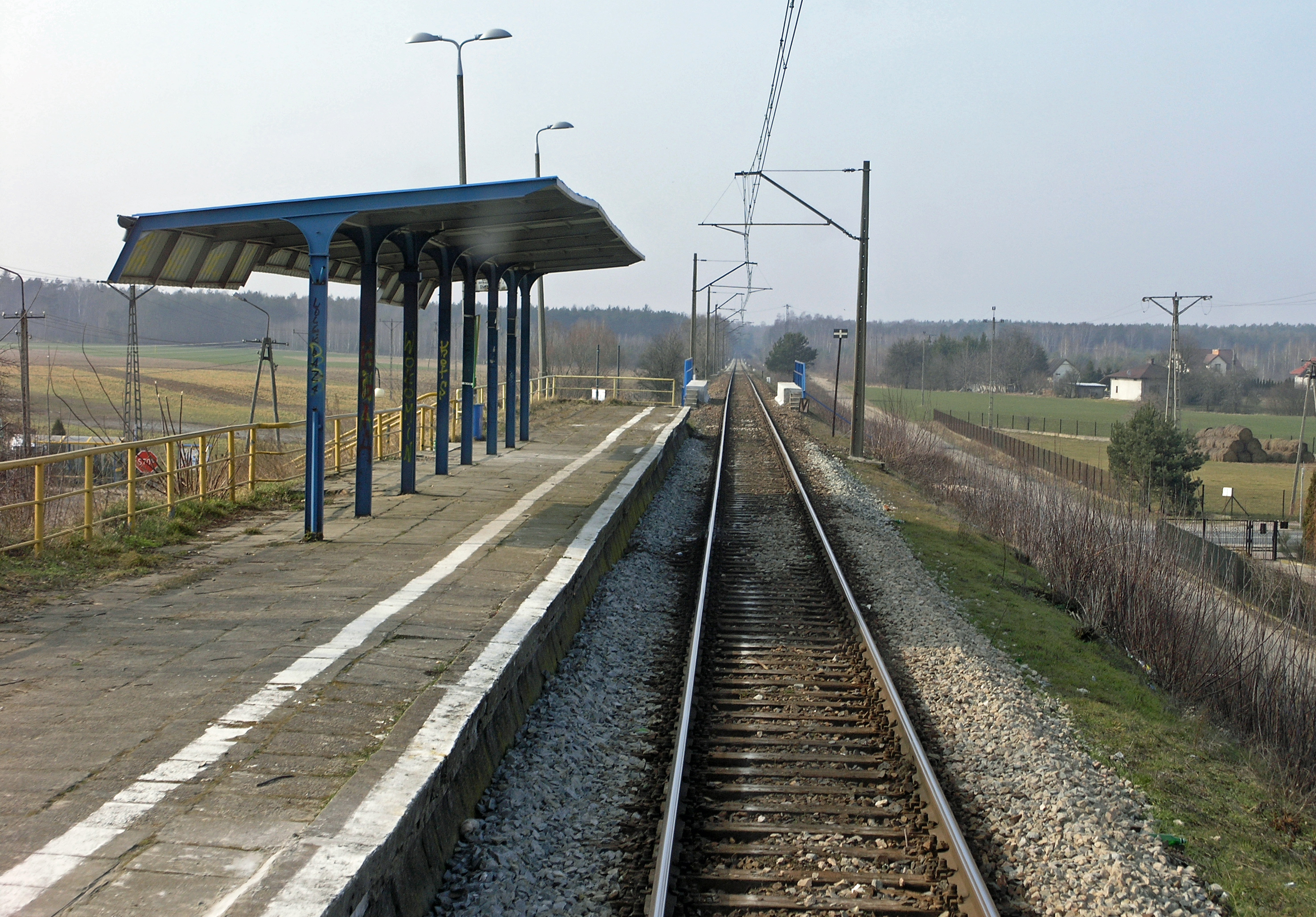

General information
- Location: Nieporęt, Nieporęt, Legionowo, Masovian; Poland
- Coordinates: 52°25′51″N 21°01′54″E
- System: Rail Station
- Owner: Polskie Koleje Państwowe S.A.

Services
Preceding station	Masovian Railways	Following station
Wieliszew towards Legionowo	R92	Dąbkowizna towards Tłuszcz
Preceding station	SKM Warsaw	Following station
Wieliszew towards Warsaw Chopin Airport	S3	Dąbkowizna towards Radzymin
Location

Nieporęt railway station is a railway station in Nieporęt, Legionowo, Poland. It is served by Masovian Railways.
