= Góra, Legionowo County =

Góra
- Village
- Location within Poland
- Coordinates: 52°26′N 20°47′E
- Country: Poland
- Voivodeship: Masovian
- County: Legionowo
- Gmina: Wieliszew
- Population: 740

Góra [ˈɡura] is a village in the administrative district of Gmina Wieliszew, located within Legionowo County, Masovian Voivodeship, in east-central Poland. It situated about 13 km (8 mi) west of Wieliszew, 10 km (6 mi) west of Legionowo, and 29 km (18 mi) north-west of Warsaw.
