= Kania Nowa =

- Village
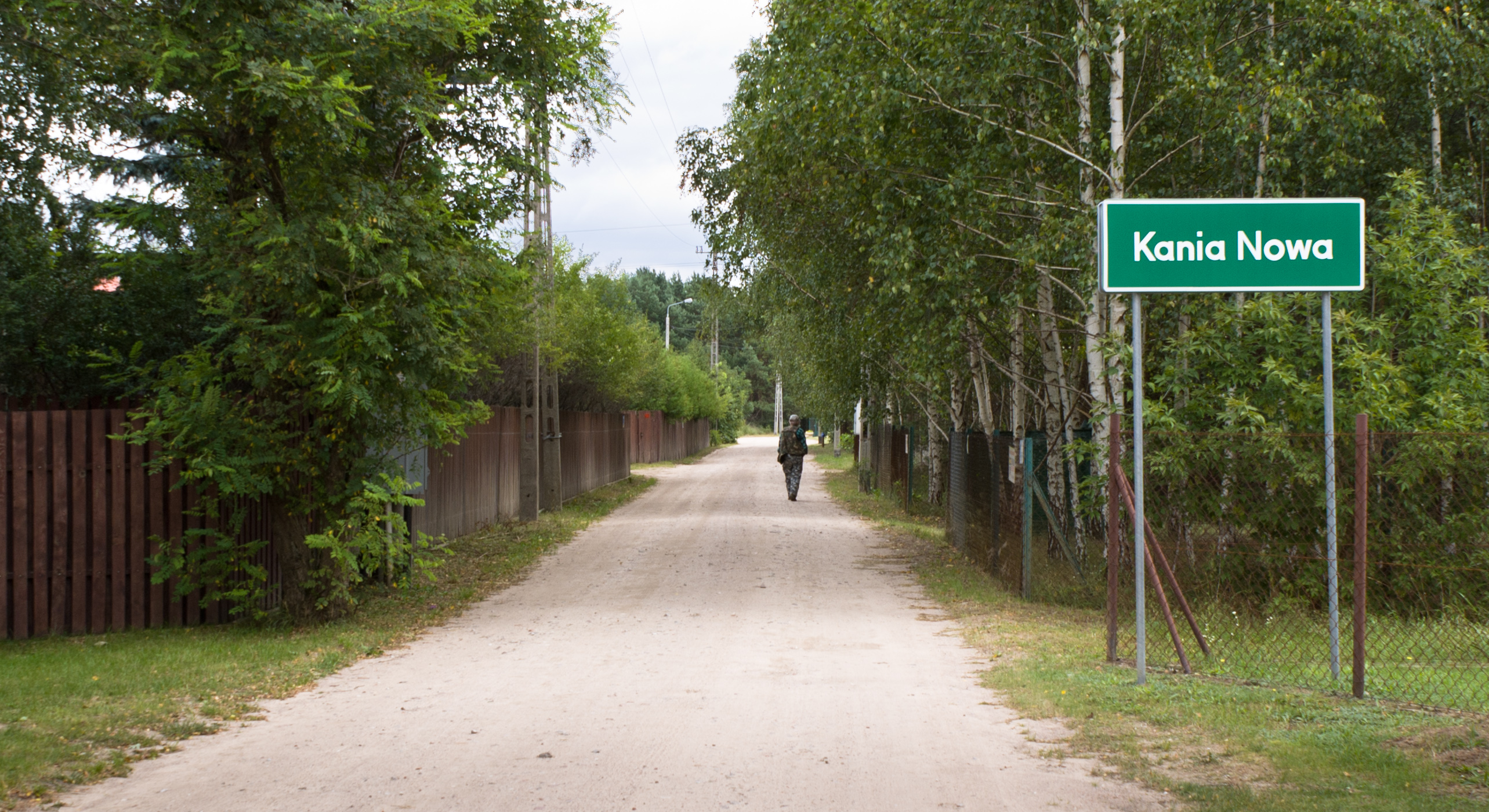

- Location within Poland
- Coordinates: 52°31′18″N 21°7′37″E
- Country: Poland
- Voivodeship: Masovian
- County: Legionowo
- Gmina: Serock
- Population: 100

Kania Nowa [ˈkaɲa ˈnɔva] is a village in the administrative district of Gmina Serock, within Legionowo County, Masovian Voivodeship, in east-central Poland.
