= Trzciany, Masovian Voivodeship =

Trzciany
- Village
- Location within Poland
- Coordinates: 52°25′N 20°47′E
- Country: Poland
- Voivodeship: Masovian
- County: Legionowo
- Gmina: Jabłonna
- Population: 125

Trzciany [ˈtʂt͡ɕanɨ] is a village in the administrative district of Gmina Jabłonna, within Legionowo County, Masovian Voivodeship, in east-central Poland.
