= Nowa Wieś, Legionowo County =

Nowa Wieś
- Village
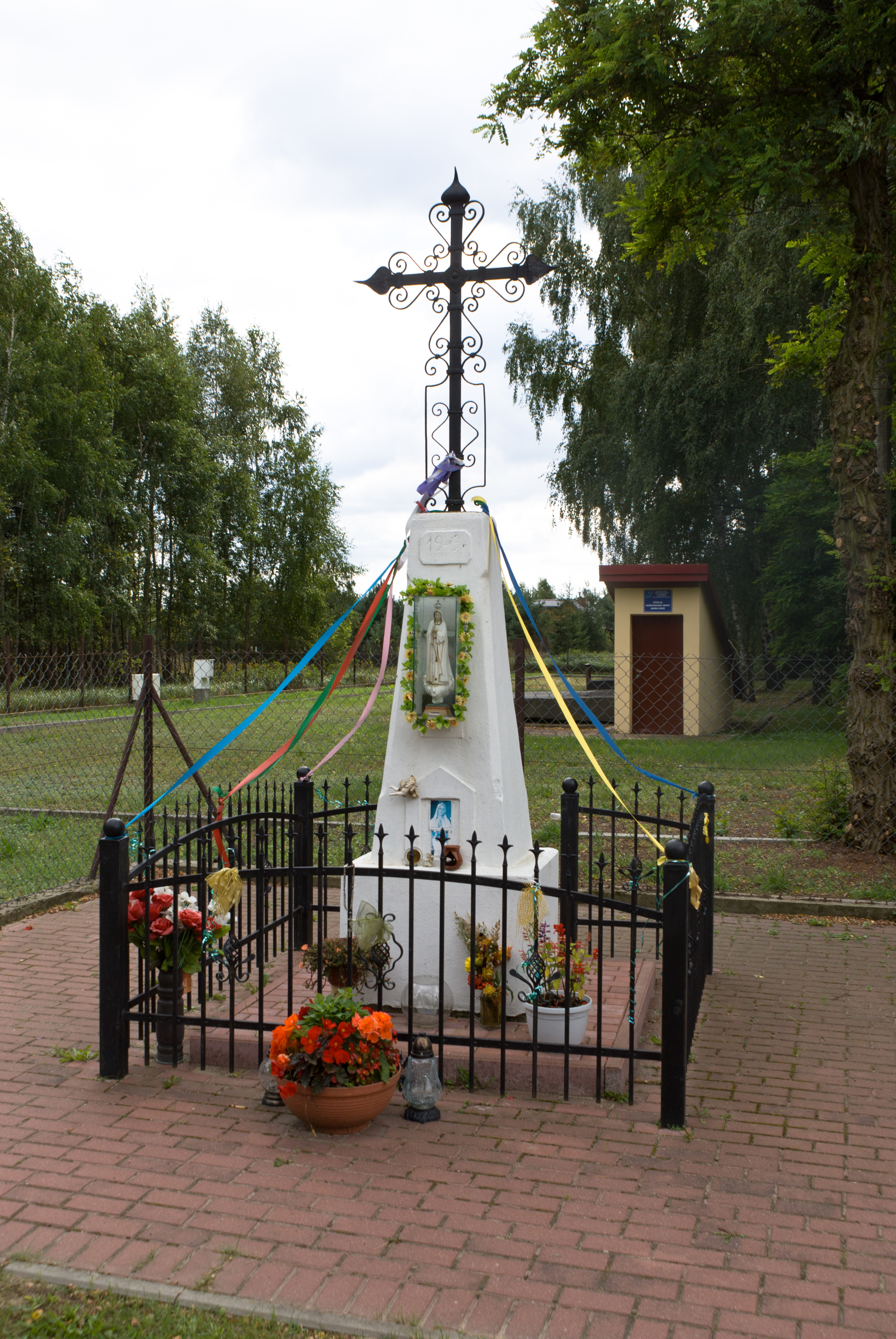
- Wayside shrine in Nowa Wieś

- Location within Poland
- Coordinates: 52°31′39″N 21°06′49″E
- Country: Poland
- Voivodeship: Masovian
- County: Legionowo
- Gmina: Serock

Nowa Wieś [ˈnɔva ˈvjɛɕ] is a village in the administrative district of Gmina Serock, within Legionowo County, Masovian Voivodeship, in east-central Poland.
