= Izbica, Masovian Voivodeship =

Izbica
- Village
- Location within Poland
- Coordinates: 52°30′N 20°57′E
- Country: Poland
- Voivodeship: Masovian
- County: Legionowo
- Gmina: Serock

Izbica [izˈbit͡sa] is a village in the administrative district of Gmina Serock, within Legionowo County, Masovian Voivodeship, in east-central Poland.
