= Chotomów =

- Village
- Location within Poland
- Coordinates: 52°25′N 20°53′E
- Country: Poland
- Voivodeship: Masovian
- County: Legionowo
- Gmina: Jabłonna
- Population: 4,349
- Website: http://www.chotomow.pl

Chotomów [xɔˈtɔmuf] is a village in the administrative district of Gmina Jabłonna, within Legionowo County, Masovian Voivodeship, in east-central Poland.
