= Marynino =

- Village
- Location within Poland
- Coordinates: 52°31′N 21°0′E
- Country: Poland
- Voivodeship: Masovian
- County: Legionowo
- Gmina: Serock

Marynino [marɨˈninɔ] is a village in the administrative district of Gmina Serock, within Legionowo County, Masovian Voivodeship, in east-central Poland.
