= Wierzbica, Legionowo County =

Wierzbica
- Village
- Location within Poland
- Coordinates: 52°32′10″N 21°4′23″E
- Country: Poland
- Voivodeship: Masovian
- County: Legionowo
- Gmina: Serock
- Population: 440

Wierzbica [vjɛʐˈbit͡sa] is a village in the administrative district of Gmina Serock, within Legionowo County, Masovian Voivodeship, in east-central Poland.
