= Jadwisin, Legionowo County =

Jadwisin
- Village
- Location within Poland
- Coordinates: 52°28′44″N 21°2′38″E
- Country: Poland
- Voivodeship: Masovian
- County: Legionowo
- Gmina: Serock
- Population: 1,000

Jadwisin [jadˈviɕin] is a village in the administrative district of Gmina Serock, within Legionowo County, Masovian Voivodeship, in east-central Poland.
