= Sikory, Legionowo County =

Sikory
- Village
- Location within Poland
- Coordinates: 52°28′55″N 20°49′53″E
- Country: Poland
- Voivodeship: Masovian
- County: Legionowo
- Gmina: Wieliszew
- Population: 10

Sikory [ɕiˈkɔrɨ] is a village in the administrative district of Gmina Wieliszew, within Legionowo County, Masovian Voivodeship, in east-central Poland.
