= Krubin, Legionowo County =

Krubin
- Village
- Location within Poland
- Coordinates: 52°27′N 20°49′E
- Country: Poland
- Voivodeship: Masovian
- County: Legionowo
- Gmina: Wieliszew

Krubin [ˈkrubin] is a village in the administrative district of Gmina Wieliszew, within Legionowo County, Masovian Voivodeship, in east-central Poland.
