= Stasi Las =

- Village
- Location within Poland
- Coordinates: 52°29′5″N 21°2′28″E
- Country: Poland
- Voivodeship: Masovian
- County: Legionowo
- Gmina: Serock

Stasi Las [ˈstaɕi ˈlas] is a village in the administrative district of Gmina Serock, within Legionowo County, Masovian Voivodeship, in east-central Poland.
