= Borowa Góra, Masovian Voivodeship =

Borowa Góra
- Village
- Location within Poland
- Coordinates: 52°28′43″N 21°1′56″E
- Country: Poland
- Voivodeship: Masovian
- County: Legionowo
- Gmina: Serock
- Population: 530

Borowa Góra [bɔˈrɔva ˈɡura] is a village in the administrative district of Gmina Serock, within Legionowo County, Masovian Voivodeship, in east-central Poland.
