= Stanisławów Drugi, Masovian Voivodeship =

Stanisławów Drugi
- Village
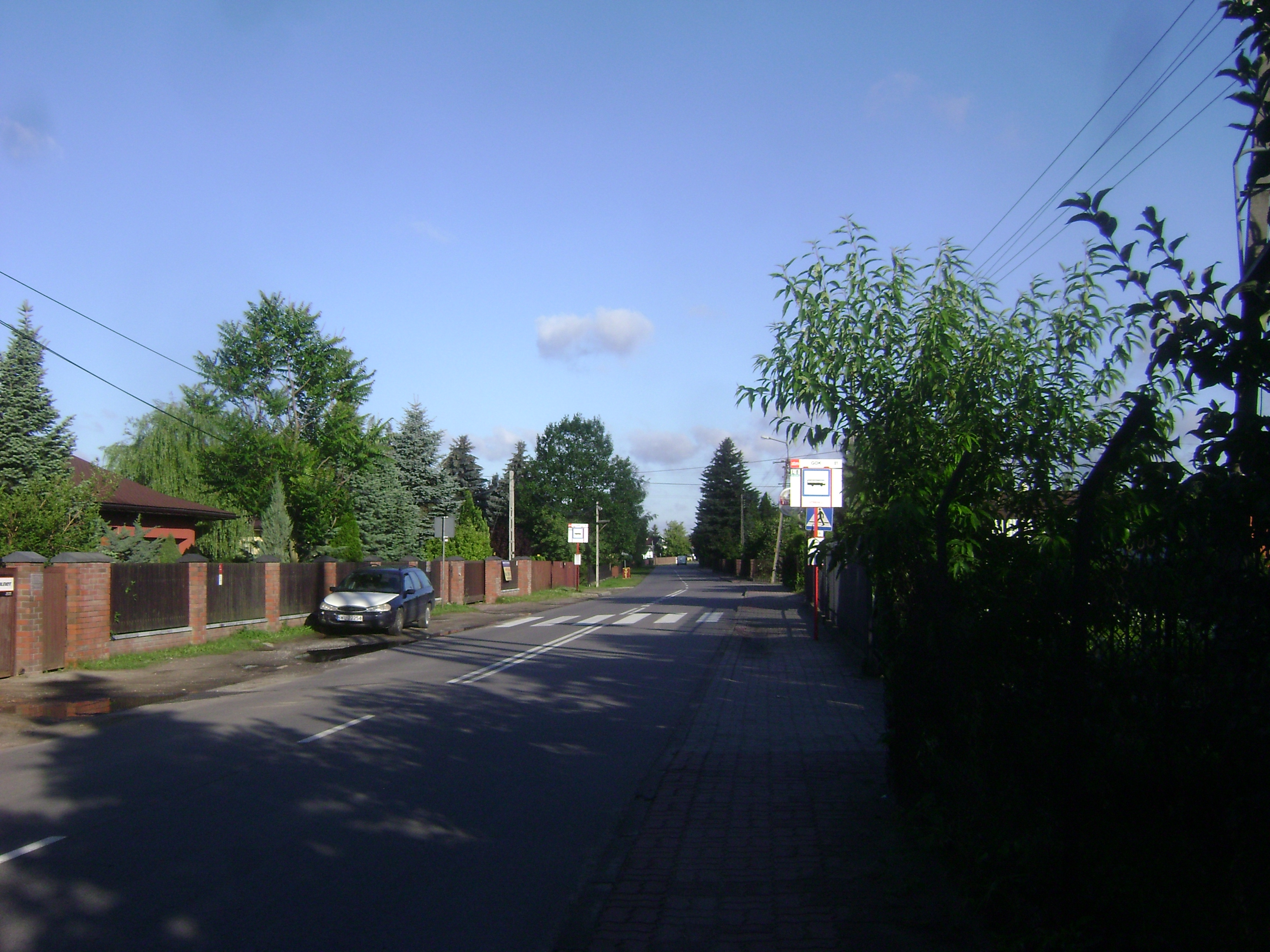

- Location within Poland
- Coordinates: 52°24′28″N 20°58′29″E
- Country: Poland
- Voivodeship: Masovian
- County: Legionowo
- Gmina: Nieporęt
- Population: 479

Stanisławów Drugi [staniˈswavuf ˈdruɡi] is a village in the administrative district of Gmina Nieporęt, within Legionowo County, Masovian Voivodeship, in east-central Poland.
