= Stanisławów Pierwszy, Masovian Voivodeship =

Stanisławów Pierwszy
- Village
- Location within Poland
- Coordinates: 52°22′56″N 21°2′30″E
- Country: Poland
- Voivodeship: Masovian
- County: Legionowo
- Gmina: Nieporęt
- Elevation: 80 m (260 ft)
- Population: 1,102

Stanisławów Pierwszy [staniˈswavuf ˈpjɛrfʂɨ] is a village in the administrative district of Gmina Nieporęt, within Legionowo County, Masovian Voivodeship, in east-central Poland.
