= Zabłocie, Legionowo County =

Zabłocie
- Village
- Location within Poland
- Coordinates: 52°33′N 20°56′E
- Country: Poland
- Voivodeship: Masovian
- County: Legionowo
- Gmina: Serock

Zabłocie [zaˈbwɔt͡ɕɛ] is a village in the administrative district of Gmina Serock, within Legionowo County, Masovian Voivodeship, in east-central Poland.
