= Rajszew =

- Village
- Location within Poland
- Coordinates: 52°23′N 20°51′E
- Country: Poland
- Voivodeship: Masovian
- County: Legionowo
- Gmina: Jabłonna
- Population: 373

Rajszew [ˈrai̯ʂɛf] is a village in the administrative district of Gmina Jabłonna, within Legionowo County, Masovian Voivodeship, in east-central Poland.
