= Skrzeszew, Legionowo County =

Skrzeszew
- Village
- Location within Poland
- Coordinates: 52°27′N 20°53′E
- Country: Poland
- Voivodeship: Masovian
- County: Legionowo
- Gmina: Wieliszew
- Population: 760

Skrzeszew [ˈskʂɛʂɛf] is a village in the administrative district of Gmina Wieliszew, within Legionowo County, Masovian Voivodeship, in east-central Poland.
