= Łacha, Masovian Voivodeship =

Łacha
- Village
- Location within Poland
- Coordinates: 52°32′32″N 21°5′34″E
- Country: Poland
- Voivodeship: Masovian
- County: Legionowo
- Gmina: Serock

Łacha [ˈwaxa] is a village in the administrative district of Gmina Serock, within Legionowo County, Masovian Voivodeship, in east-central Poland.

Lacha was primarily a village of ethnic Germans before World War 2.
