= Święcienica =

- Village
- Location within Poland
- Coordinates: 52°32′39″N 20°57′20″E
- Country: Poland
- Voivodeship: Masovian
- County: Legionowo
- Gmina: Serock

Święcienica (Polish pronunciation: [ɕfjɛɲt͡ɕɛˈɲit͡sa]) is a village in the administrative district of Gmina Serock, within Legionowo County, Masovian Voivodeship, in east-central Poland.
