= Boża Wola, Legionowo County =

Boża Wola
- Village
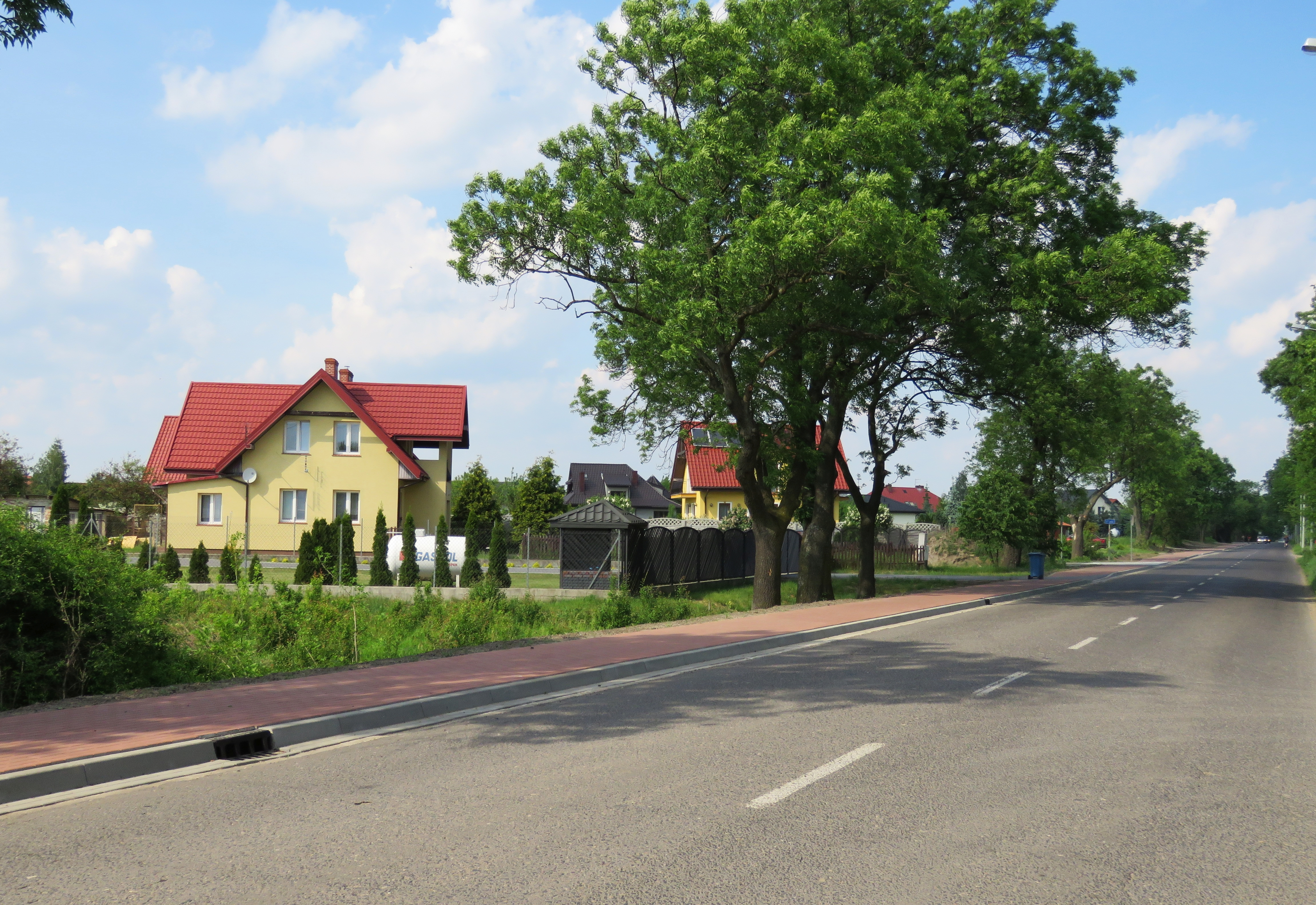

- Location within Poland
- Coordinates: 52°25′N 20°46′E
- Country: Poland
- Voivodeship: Masovian
- County: Legionowo
- Gmina: Jabłonna

Population
  - Total: 288
- Time zone: UTC+1 (CET)
  - Summer (DST): UTC+2 (CEST)

Boża Wola [ˈbɔʐa ˈvɔla] is a village in the administrative district of Gmina Jabłonna, within Legionowo County, Masovian Voivodeship, in east-central Poland.

Nine Polish citizens were murdered by Nazi Germany in the village during World War II.
