= Michałów-Grabina =

- Village
- Location within Poland
- Coordinates: 52°21′47″N 21°1′19″E
- Country: Poland
- Voivodeship: Masovian
- County: Legionowo
- Gmina: Nieporęt
- Population: 502

Michałów-Grabina [miˈxawuf ɡraˈbina] is a village in the administrative district of Gmina Nieporęt, within Legionowo County, Masovian Voivodeship, in east-central Poland.

As of 29 October 2008, the village had 161 hectares of land and 601 inhabitants.

From 1975 to 1998 the town administratively belonged to the province of Warsaw.

Famous Michalów-Grabiny residents include:

- Krzysztof Daukszewicz
- Jerzy Kryszak
- Wojciech Mann
- Thomas Raczki
- Michał Żewłakow

Near the village are the ruins of a cemetery of German colonists who settled in these areas in the nineteenth century.
