= Stanisławowo, Legionowo County =

Stanisławowo
- Village
- Location within Poland
- Coordinates: 52°31′21″N 20°54′56″E
- Country: Poland
- Voivodeship: Masovian
- County: Legionowo
- Gmina: Serock
- Population: 150

Stanisławowo [staniswaˈvɔvɔ] is a village in the administrative district of Gmina Serock, within Legionowo County, Masovian Voivodeship, in east-central Poland.
