= Białobrzegi, Legionowo County =

Białobrzegi
- Village
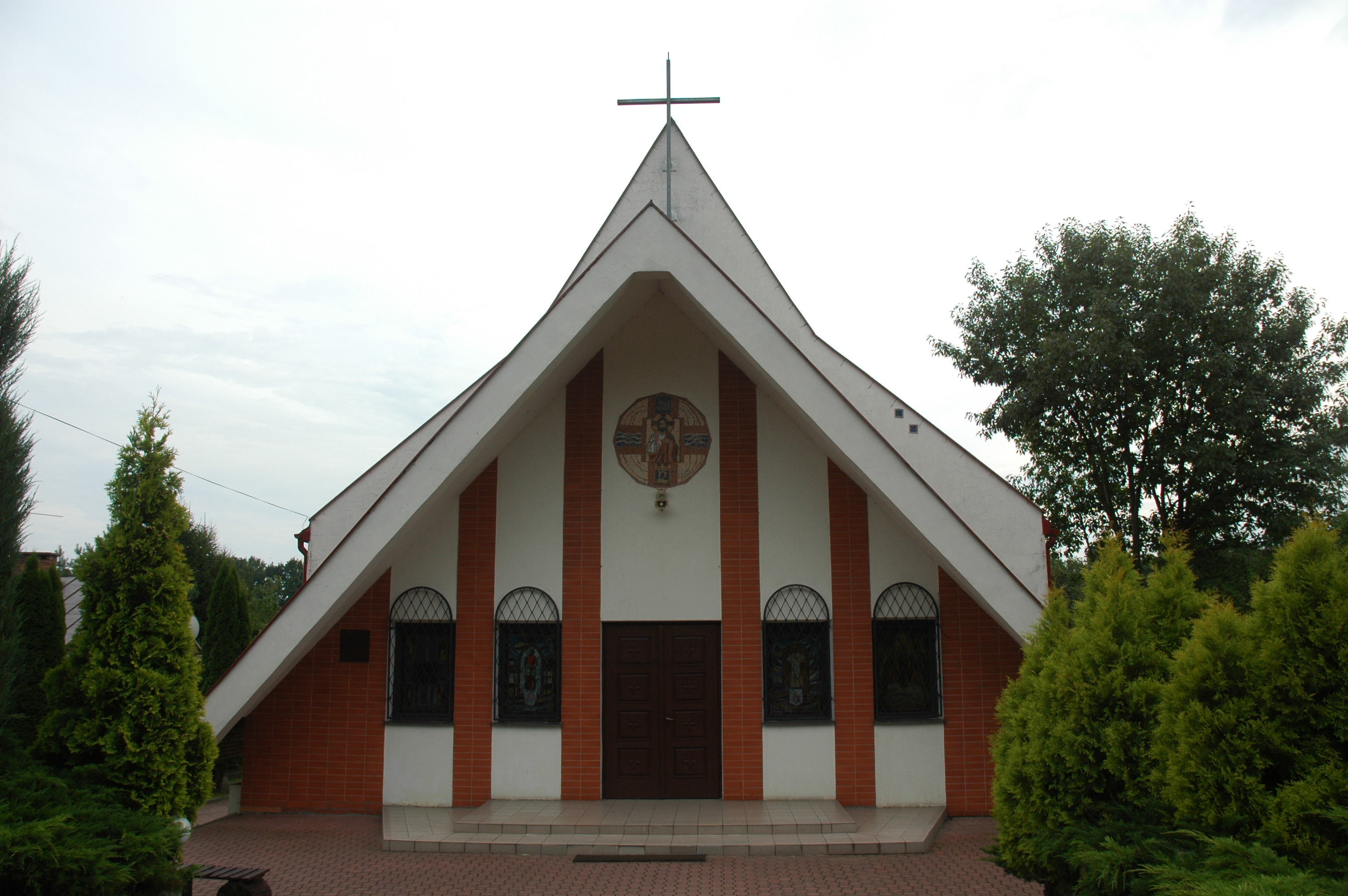
- Church of Blessed Karolina Kózka

- Location within Poland
- Coordinates: 52°26′37″N 21°3′29″E
- Country: Poland
- Voivodeship: Masovian
- County: Legionowo
- Gmina: Nieporęt
- Population: 1,232

Białobrzegi [bjawɔˈbʐɛɡi] is a village in the administrative district of Gmina Nieporęt, within Legionowo County, Masovian Voivodeship, in east-central Poland.
