= Skierdy =

- Village
- Location within Poland
- Coordinates: 52°24′N 20°49′E
- Country: Poland
- Voivodeship: Masovian
- County: Legionowo
- Gmina: Jabłonna
- Population: 548

Skierdy [ˈskʲɛrdɨ] is a village in the administrative district of Gmina Jabłonna, within Legionowo County, Masovian Voivodeship, in east-central Poland.

The village has a population of 548.
