= Józefów, Legionowo County =

Józefów
- Village
- Location within Poland
- Coordinates: 52°23′N 21°0′E
- Country: Poland
- Voivodeship: Masovian
- County: Legionowo
- Gmina: Nieporęt

Józefów (Polish pronunciation: [juˈzɛfuf]) is a village in the administrative district of Gmina Nieporęt, within Legionowo County, Masovian Voivodeship, in east-central Poland.

The village has a parish church, Parafia pw. Najświętszej Maryi Panny Królowej w Józefowie k. Legionowa, built in 1997–2004.
