= Wola Smolana =

- Village
- Location within Poland
- Coordinates: 52°31′N 20°58′E
- Country: Poland
- Voivodeship: Masovian
- County: Legionowo
- Gmina: Serock

Wola Smolana [ˈvɔla smɔˈlana] is a village in the administrative district of Gmina Serock, within Legionowo County, Masovian Voivodeship, in east-central Poland.
