= Izabelin, Legionowo County =

Izabelin
- Village
- Location within Poland
- Coordinates: 52°23′34″N 21°3′24″E
- Country: Poland
- Voivodeship: Masovian
- County: Legionowo
- Gmina: Nieporęt
- Population: 226

Izabelin [izaˈbɛlin] is a village in the administrative district of Gmina Nieporęt, within Legionowo County, Masovian Voivodeship, in east-central Poland.
