= Kałuszyn, Legionowo County =

Kałuszyn
- Village
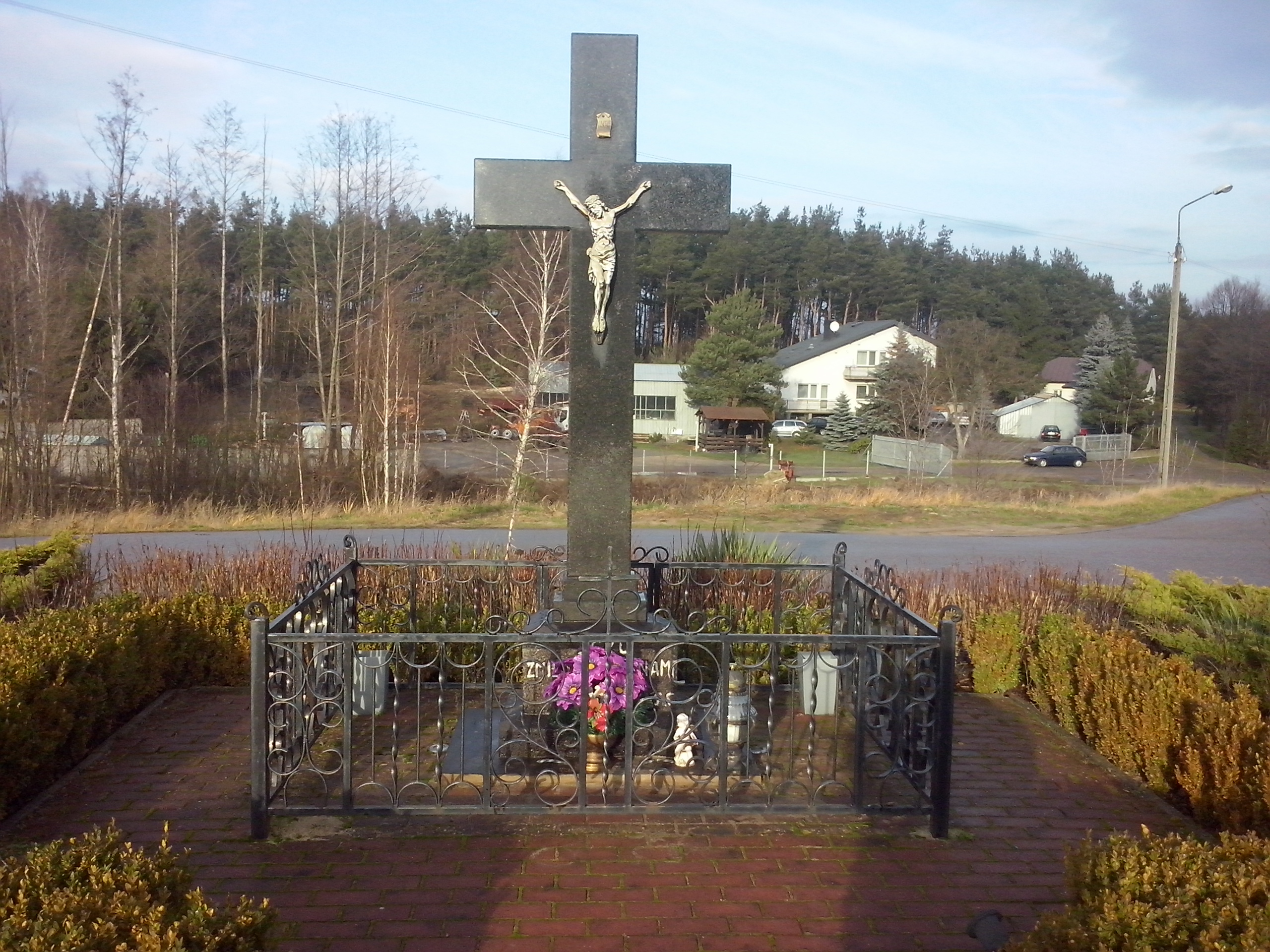
- Wayside cross in Kałuszyn

- Location within Poland
- Coordinates: 52°27′16″N 20°52′29″E
- Country: Poland
- Voivodeship: Masovian
- County: Legionowo
- Gmina: Wieliszew
- Population: 443 (2,011)
- Time zone: UTC+1 (CET)
  - Summer (DST): UTC+2 (CEST)
- Vehicle registration: WL

Kałuszyn [kaˈwuʂɨn] is a village in the administrative district of Gmina Wieliszew, within Legionowo County, Masovian Voivodeship, in east-central Poland. In 2011 it had a population of 443 people.

== History ==
During World War II the village was liberated on January 15, 1945 by the soviet 47th army after a successful battle against the troops of the german army which earned military decorations for soviet soldiers Vasilij Semynin, Grigorij Sandulyak, Grigorij Čurakov, Timofej Ciabanu, Grigorij Dzjuba, Nikolaj Isaev, Kuz’ma Tatarov and Aleksandr Shabljugin.
