= Dąbrowa Chotomowska =

- Village
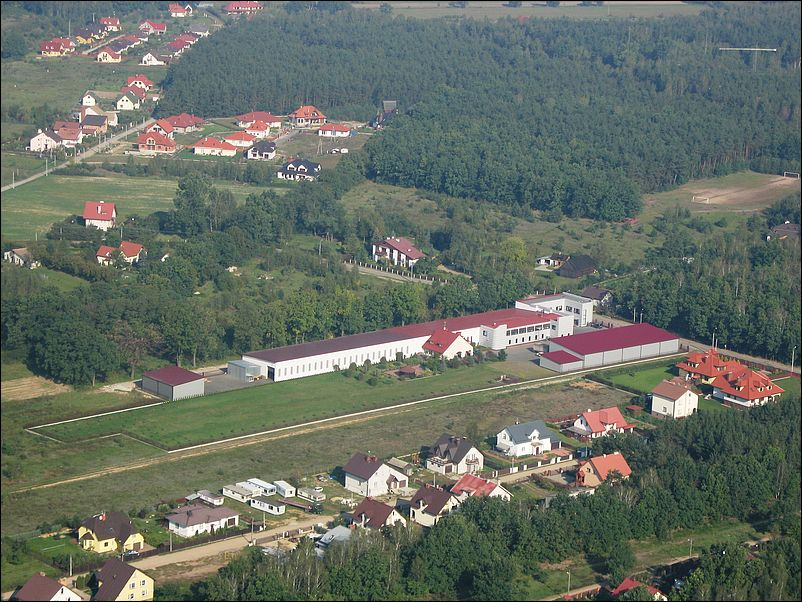

- Location within Poland
- Coordinates: 52°25′N 20°52′E
- Country: Poland
- Voivodeship: Masovian
- County: Legionowo
- Gmina: Jabłonna

Government
  - Soltys: Czesław Derlacz
- Population: 623
- Website: www.jablonna.pl/index.php?cmd=zawartosc&opt=pokaz&id=788&lang=

Dąbrowa Chotomowska [dɔmˈbrɔva xɔtɔˈmɔfska] is a village in the administrative district of Gmina Jabłonna, within Legionowo County, Masovian Voivodeship, in east-central Poland.
