= Wola Aleksandra =

- Village
- Location within Poland
- Coordinates: 52°24′N 20°59′E
- Country: Poland
- Voivodeship: Masovian
- County: Legionowo
- Gmina: Nieporęt
- Population: 136

Wola Aleksandra [ˈvɔla alɛkˈsandra] is a village in the administrative district of Gmina Nieporęt, within Legionowo County, Masovian Voivodeship, in east-central Poland.
