= Aleksandrów, Legionowo County =

Aleksandrów
- Village
- Location within Poland
- Coordinates: 52°23′48″N 21°2′41″E
- Country: Poland
- Voivodeship: Masovian
- County: Legionowo
- Gmina: Nieporęt
- Population: 217

Aleksandrów [alɛkˈsandruf] is a village in the administrative district of Gmina Nieporęt, within Legionowo County, Masovian Voivodeship, in east-central Poland.
