= Bolesławowo, Masovian Voivodeship =

Bolesławowo
- Village
- Location within Poland
- Coordinates: 52°30′6″N 20°55′41″E
- Country: Poland
- Voivodeship: Masovian
- County: Legionowo
- Gmina: Serock

Bolesławowo [bɔlɛswaˈvɔvɔ] is a village in the administrative district of Gmina Serock, within Legionowo County, Masovian Voivodeship, in east-central Poland.
