= Gmina Jabłonna =

Gmina Jabłonna may refer to either of the following rural administrative districts in Poland:

- Gmina Jabłonna, Masovian Voivodeship
- Gmina Jabłonna, Lublin Voivodeship
