= Olszewnica Stara =

- Village
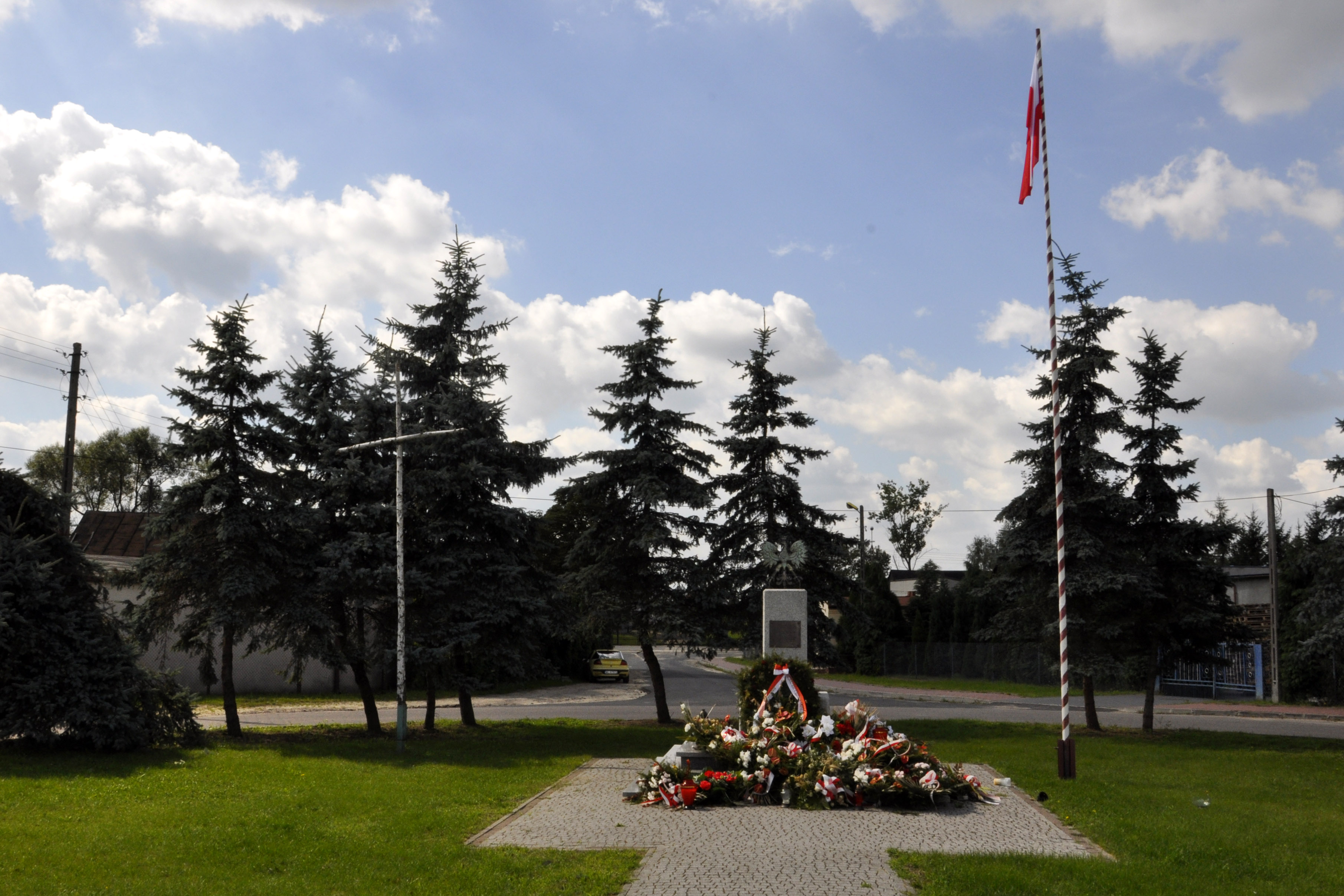
- Monument to Poland's independence from 1930 in Olszewnica Stara

- Location within Poland
- Coordinates: 52°26′N 20°52′E
- Country: Poland
- Voivodeship: Masovian
- County: Legionowo
- Gmina: Wieliszew
- Time zone: UTC+1 (CET)
  - Summer (DST): UTC+2 (CEST)
- Vehicle registration: WL

Olszewnica Stara [ɔlʂɛvˈnit͡sa ˈstara] is a village in the administrative district of Gmina Wieliszew, within Legionowo County, Masovian Voivodeship, in east-central Poland.

In the late 19th century, the village had a population of 390.
