= Kąty Węgierskie =

- Village
- Location within Poland
- Coordinates: 52°23′9″N 21°0′57″E
- Country: Poland
- Voivodeship: Masovian
- County: Legionowo
- Gmina: Nieporęt
- Population: 461

Kąty Węgierskie [ˈkɔntɨ vɛnˈɡʲɛrskʲɛ] is a village in the administrative district of Gmina Nieporęt, within Legionowo County, Masovian Voivodeship, in east-central Poland.
