= Olszewnica Nowa =

- Village
- Location within Poland
- Coordinates: 52°26′N 20°50′E
- Country: Poland
- Voivodeship: Masovian
- County: Legionowo
- Gmina: Wieliszew
- Population: 170

Olszewnica Nowa [ɔlʂɛvˈnit͡sa ˈnɔva] is a village in the administrative district of Gmina Wieliszew, within Legionowo County, Masovian Voivodeship, in east-central Poland.
