= Janówek Pierwszy =

- Village
- Location within Poland
- Coordinates: 52°26′25″N 20°47′24″E
- Country: Poland
- Voivodeship: Masovian
- County: Legionowo
- Gmina: Wieliszew
- Population: 520

Janówek Pierwszy [jaˈnuvɛk ˈpjɛrfʂɨ] is a village in the administrative district of Gmina Wieliszew, within Legionowo County, Masovian Voivodeship, in east-central Poland.

In 2005 the village had a population of 520.
