= Cupel, Legionowo County =

Cupel
- Village
- Location within Poland
- Coordinates: 52°31′00″N 21°05′26″E
- Country: Poland
- Voivodeship: Masovian
- County: Legionowo
- Gmina: Serock

Cupel [ˈt͡supɛl] is a village in the administrative district of Gmina Serock, within Legionowo County, Masovian Voivodeship, in east-central Poland.
