= Gąsiorowo, Legionowo County =

Gąsiorowo
- Village
- Location within Poland
- Coordinates: 52°33′09″N 21°06′29″E
- Country: Poland
- Voivodeship: Masovian
- County: Legionowo
- Gmina: Serock

Gąsiorowo [ɡɔ̃ɕɔˈrɔvɔ] is a village in the administrative district of Gmina Serock, in Legionowo County, Masovian Voivodeship, in east-central Poland.
