= Zalesie Borowe =

- Village
- Location within Poland
- Coordinates: 52°33′17″N 20°57′46″E
- Country: Poland
- Voivodeship: Masovian
- County: Legionowo
- Gmina: Serock

Zalesie Borowe [zaˈlɛɕɛ bɔˈrɔvɛ] is a village in the administrative district of Gmina Serock, within Legionowo County, Masovian Voivodeship, in east-central Poland. The population as of 2023 is 65.
