= Wólka Górska =

- Village
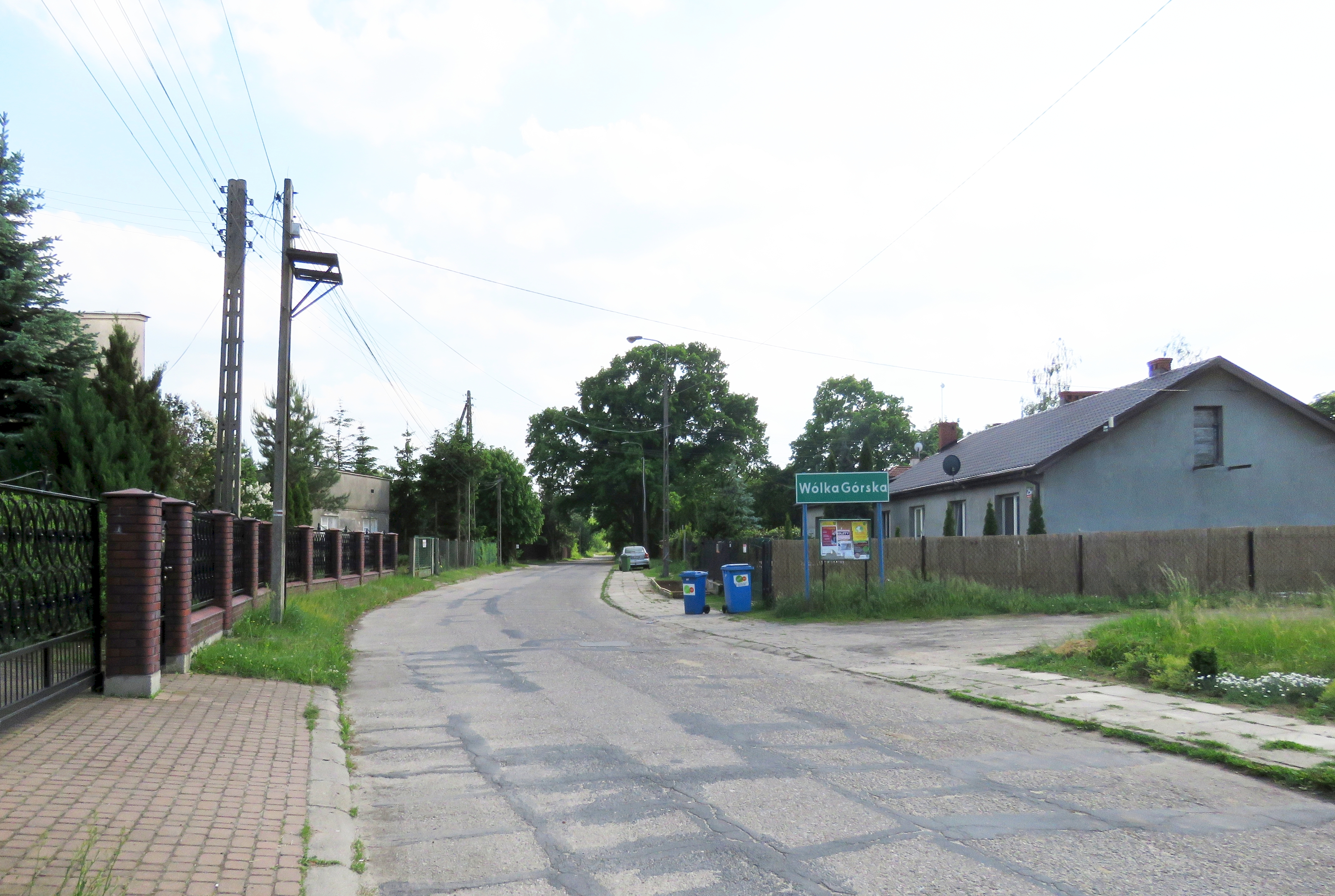
- Wólka Górska

- Location within Poland
- Coordinates: 52°24′40″N 20°45′27″E
- Country: Poland
- Voivodeship: Masovian
- County: Legionowo
- Gmina: Jabłonna
- Population: 75

Wólka Górska [ˈvulka ˈɡurska] is a village in the administrative district of Gmina Jabłonna, within Legionowo County, Masovian Voivodeship, in east-central Poland.
