= Rządza (river) =

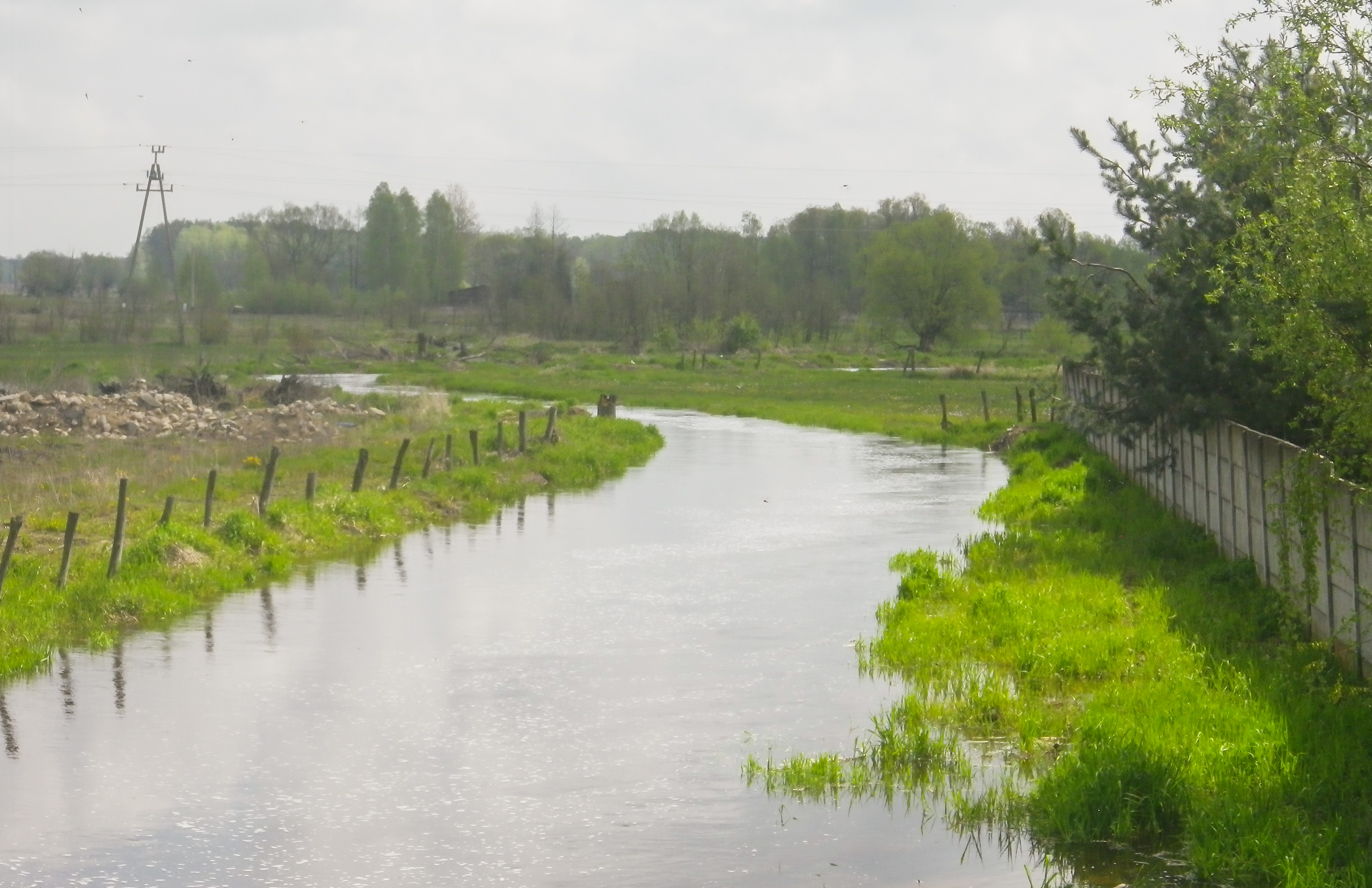

Location
- Country: Poland
- Voivodeship: Masovian

Physical characteristics
- Source
  - location: near Chrościce, Mińsk County
  - coordinates: 52°15′11″N 21°46′10″E
- Mouth: Zegrze Reservoir
  - location: Rynia, Legionowo County
  - coordinates: 52°28′34″N 21°06′56″E
- Length: 66 km (41 mi)
- Basin size: 475.9 km^{2} (183.7 mi^{2})

Basin features
- Progression: Narew→ Vistula→ Baltic Sea

Rządza is a river of Poland. It flows into the Zegrze Reservoir, which is drained by the Narew, near Borki. The source zone of the Rządza is located within the morainic Kałuszyn upland. The length of the river is approximately 66 km, and the size of the catchment area is 475.9 km^{2}
