= Skubianka =

- Village
- Location within Poland
- Coordinates: 52°29′N 21°0′E
- Country: Poland
- Voivodeship: Masovian
- County: Legionowo
- Gmina: Serock

Skubianka [skuˈbjaŋka] is a village in the administrative district of Gmina Serock, within Legionowo County, Masovian Voivodeship, in east-central Poland.
