= Komornica =

- Village
- Location within Poland
- Coordinates: 52°28′N 20°55′E
- Country: Poland
- Voivodeship: Masovian
- County: Legionowo
- Gmina: Wieliszew
- Population (approx.): 168

Komornica [kɔmɔrˈnit͡sa] is a Polish village which gave its name to the Komornica culture, due to the nearby archaeological sites of this culture from the Mesolithic period of Northern Europe.

Komornica is in the gmina (a Polish administrative division similar to a commune or municipality) of Gmina Wieliszew, within Legionowo County, Masovian Voivodeship, towards the east of central Poland.

The postal code of Komornica is 05-124.

From 1975 to 1998, the village was part of the Warsaw Voivodeship.

== Komornica culture ==
The oldest traces of settlements (e.g. flint tools) in the territory of the Wieliszew commune were discovered at numerous archaeological sites near the village of Komornica, dating as far back as 8000 BC. Named the Komornica culture, the traces of this Mesolithic archaeological culture have been found in parts of Poland, Germany, Denmark, and southern Sweden.
