= Wólka Radzymińska =

- Village
- Location within Poland
- Coordinates: 52°24′55″N 21°5′25″E
- Country: Poland
- Voivodeship: Masovian
- County: Legionowo
- Gmina: Nieporęt
- Population: 700

Wólka Radzymińska [ˈvulka rad͡zɨˈmiɲska] is a village in the administrative district of Gmina Nieporęt, within Legionowo County, Masovian Voivodeship, in east-central Poland.
