= Gmina Wieliszew =

Gmina Wieliszew Wieliszew Commune
- Gmina
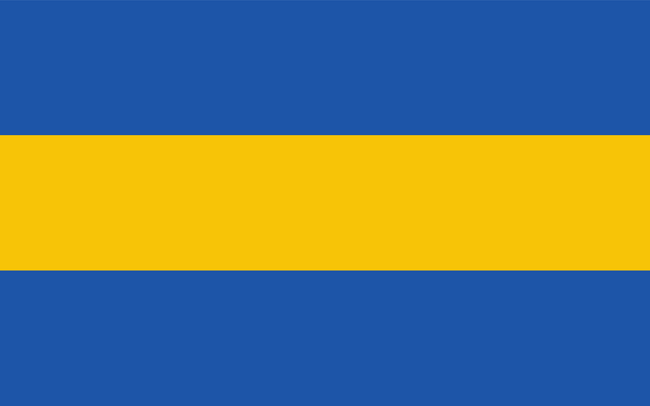
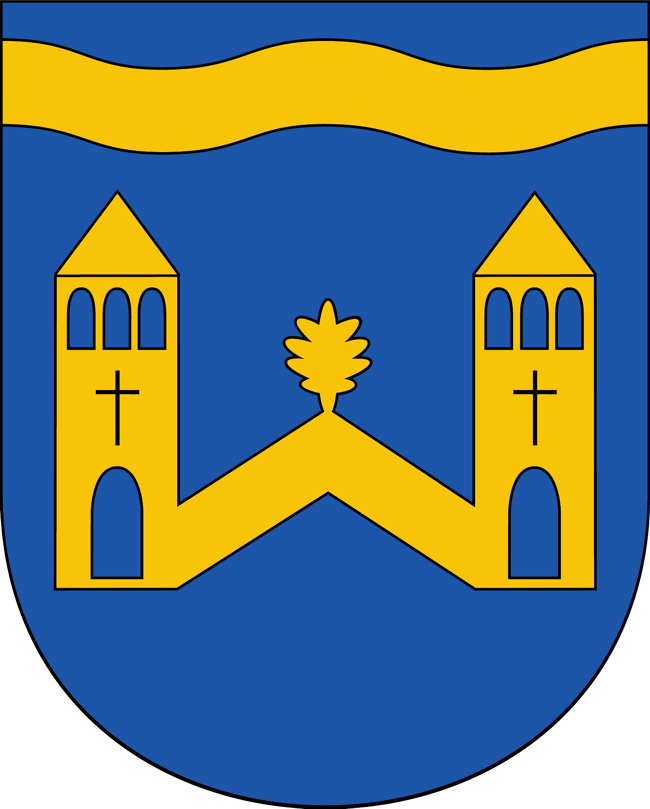
- Flag Coat of arms
- Interactive map of Gmina Wieliszew
- Coordinates (Wieliszew): 52°27′N 20°58′E
- Country: Poland
- Voivodeship: Masovian
- County: Legionowo
- Seat: Wieliszew

Area
  - Total: 108 km^{2} (42 sq mi)

Population (2013)
  - Total: 13,573
  - Density: 126/km^{2} (325/sq mi)
- Website: http://www.wieliszew.pl

Gmina Wieliszew is a rural gmina (administrative district) in Legionowo County, Masovian Voivodeship, in east-central Poland. Its seat is the village of Wieliszew, which lies approximately 7 kilometres (4 mi) north-east of Legionowo and 26 km (16 mi) north of Warsaw.

The gmina covers an area of 108 square kilometres (41.7 sq mi), and as of 2017 its total population is 13,573.

== Villages ==
Gmina Wieliszew contains the villages and settlements of Góra, Janówek Pierwszy, Kałuszyn, Komornica, Krubin, Łajski, Michałów-Reginów, Olszewnica Nowa, Olszewnica Stara, Poddębie, Sikory, Skrzeszew, Topolina and Wieliszew.

== Neighbouring gminas ==
Gmina Wieliszew is bordered by the towns of Legionowo and Nowy Dwór Mazowiecki, and by the gminas of Jabłonna, Nieporęt, Pomiechówek and Serock.
