= Jachranka =

- Village
- Location within Poland
- Coordinates: 52°29′3″N 20°58′1″E
- Country: Poland
- Voivodeship: Masovian
- County: Legionowo
- Gmina: Serock
- Population: 882

Jachranka [jaˈxranka] is a village in the administrative district of Gmina Serock, within Legionowo County, Masovian Voivodeship, in east-central Poland.

The Greece National Football Team was based here during the 2012 European Championships held in Poland and Ukraine.

== Name ==
The name probably comes from the topographic features ⇒ Niechronka (a place that does not provide a military shelter, a non-defensive place).
