= Łajski =

- Village
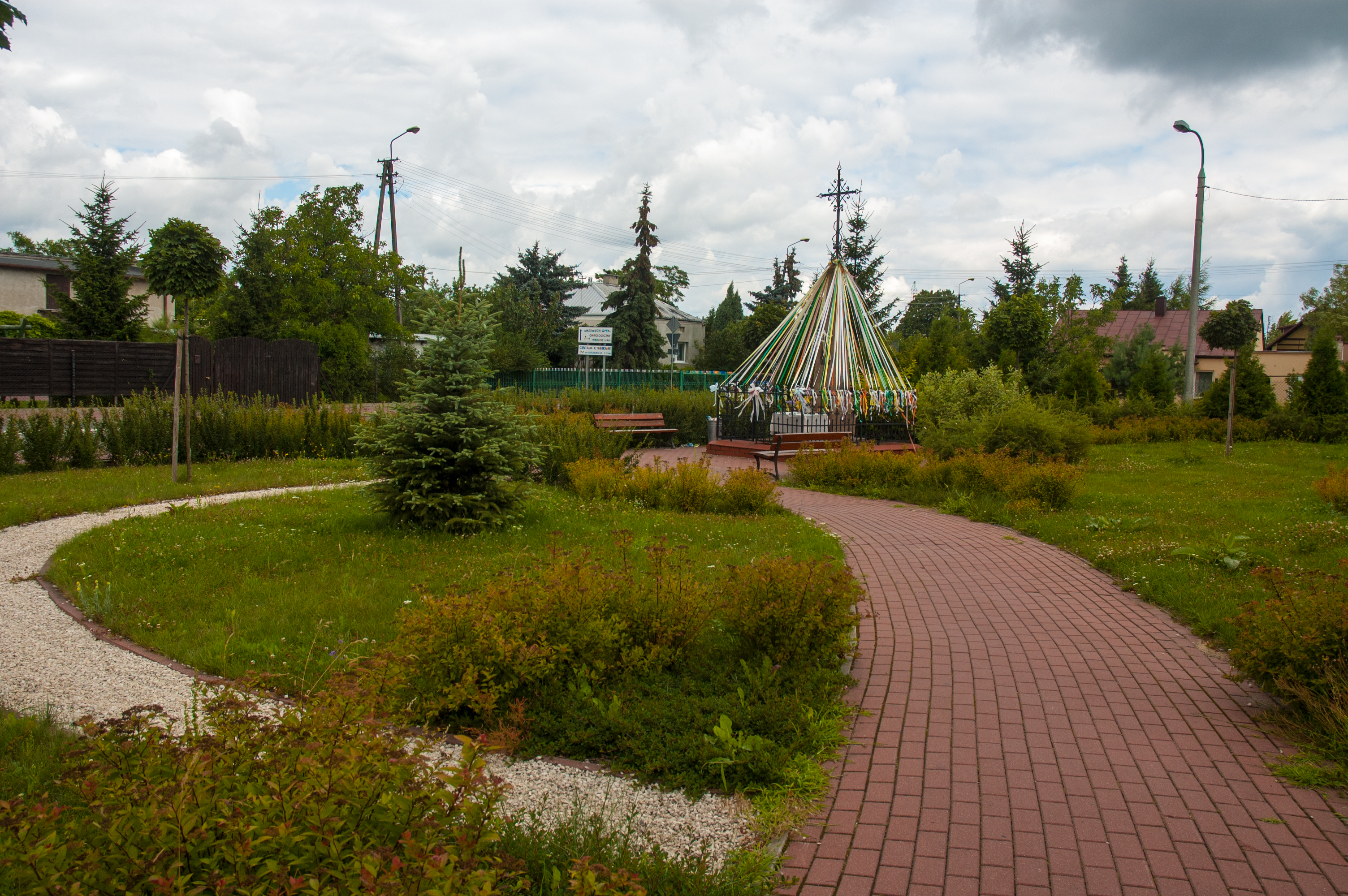
- Stanisław Pączkowski Square

- Location within Poland
- Coordinates: 52°25′N 20°57′E
- Country: Poland
- Voivodeship: Masovian
- County: Legionowo
- Gmina: Wieliszew
- Population: 1,300

Łajski is a village in Masovian Voivodeship in the Legionowo County, in the Gmina Wieliszew in Poland.

In the years 1975-1998 the area was the province of Warsaw Voivodeship.

== Location of the town ==
Łajski is located around the Warsaw Basin. It has densely wooded areas which are the northern stretch of the Pomiechowskie Forests, and in its south-eastern part are the remains of the Nieporęckiej Forest. The landscape is gently undulating plain, and the surrounding hills reach 75–85 m.

The village has about 1,300 inhabitants. Łajski lies in close proximity to Legionowo, 16 km (10 mi) from the center of Warsaw, with routes connecting to Warsaw and Gdansk (by railway) and the Masurian Lake District (national road No. 61). Less than 7 km (4 mi) away is the village of Zegrze Reservoir, which is summer relaxation destination for the inhabitants of greater Warsaw.

Łajski was formed as a result of administrative changes in 1973 and is bordered by the municipality Wieliszew and near Skrzeszew, Wieliszew and Michałów-Reginowem.

== Soil ==
Most sands here are mixed with clay, limestone and in the deep parts, small bands of carbon.

== History of the village ==
Łajski is within the territory of greater Warsaw, and consists of land formerly contained within the three historical administrative units in the ducal fief of Mazovia - the land of Warsaw, Zakroczymska and Sochaczewska. When the Crown took over, they entered into the voivodeship as part of the districts of Warsaw, Zakroczymskiego, Serocki and Sochaczew.

In 1795, these areas came under Prussian rule. In the nineteenth century most of the area fell within the precinct of Warsaw province, and only in 1952, was separated from a separate district - Nowy Dwór Mazowiecki.

In terms of church administration, the area belonged to the late eleventh century to the Diocese of Plock. In 1978 it joined the Archdiocese of Warsaw, and from 1995 Łajski became part of the Diocese of Warsaw-Praga. The diocese was founded March 25, 1992 under the edict of Pope John Paul II.

Łajski as a village was recorded in the land register as property of Count Potocki Augusta. Named after an owner Łajsk, said to be a colorful figure in those days, a Polish activist who in 1886 was one of the founders and first president of the Warsaw Society of Cyclists. The count was also the founder, in 1897, of a glass works.

In September 1939, the Army stopped the Nazi invaders in the line of the Narew, defended by an army of Modlin.

The occupation led to a further administrative divisions with the area being subordinate to the Governor General of the German Reich.

An offensive resulted in destruction in 1944. The most fierce battles between the Red Army against the German army brought immense destruction of buildings in Łajski. The proximity to the Modlin Fortress, around which took place the fiercest battles, made it necessary to start post-war redevelopment of the town from scratch.

Within Łajsk there are several archaeological sites, where the remains of the former residents of this area from different eras were found. The major findings include the excavation of the Hallstatt culture of the period possibly from the Iron Age. H. Hildebrand discovered it in 1874 and it's now accepted that the Hallstatt period were in the years 700-400 BC.

22 archaeological sites have been discovered: tombs, graves with cover, ash pan graves, pit graves, and more. One of the most interesting discoveries were urns - usually an earthen vessel, which serves to store the ashes of the deceased, which is characteristic for the cultures which used a certain funeral rite. These findings confirm the continuity of settlement in the village and surrounding areas.

== Economy ==
Mechanical Plant "Horseshoe" Poniatów

From 1933 to 1943 at the border between Łajski and Poniatów (today Michałów-Reginów) operated the Mechanical Plant "horseshoe" Poniatów. The first months of operation the plant was limited mainly to the production of horseshoes.

In later years, the range of products was constantly changing, studs were fixed and were the primary product of the plant. With time, they started to produce motorcycles.

Public places

- House Social care - Golden Autumn (Nowodworska 97)
- Municipal Cultural Center in Łajski (intersection of Nowodworska and Moniuszki)

== Education ==
There is an elementary school with a policy of inclusive education, integration in the classroom, teaching children with different disabilities, and having a decision on disability. Children with disabilities benefit from the help of many experts, i.e. assistants of disabled children, sensory integration therapist, psychologists, counselors, counselors for music therapy, art therapy and dogotherapy.

Since September 2008 there is a class in the school brass band, in which classes are conducted by graduates of the Academy of Music.
