= Rynia, Legionowo County =

Rynia
- Village
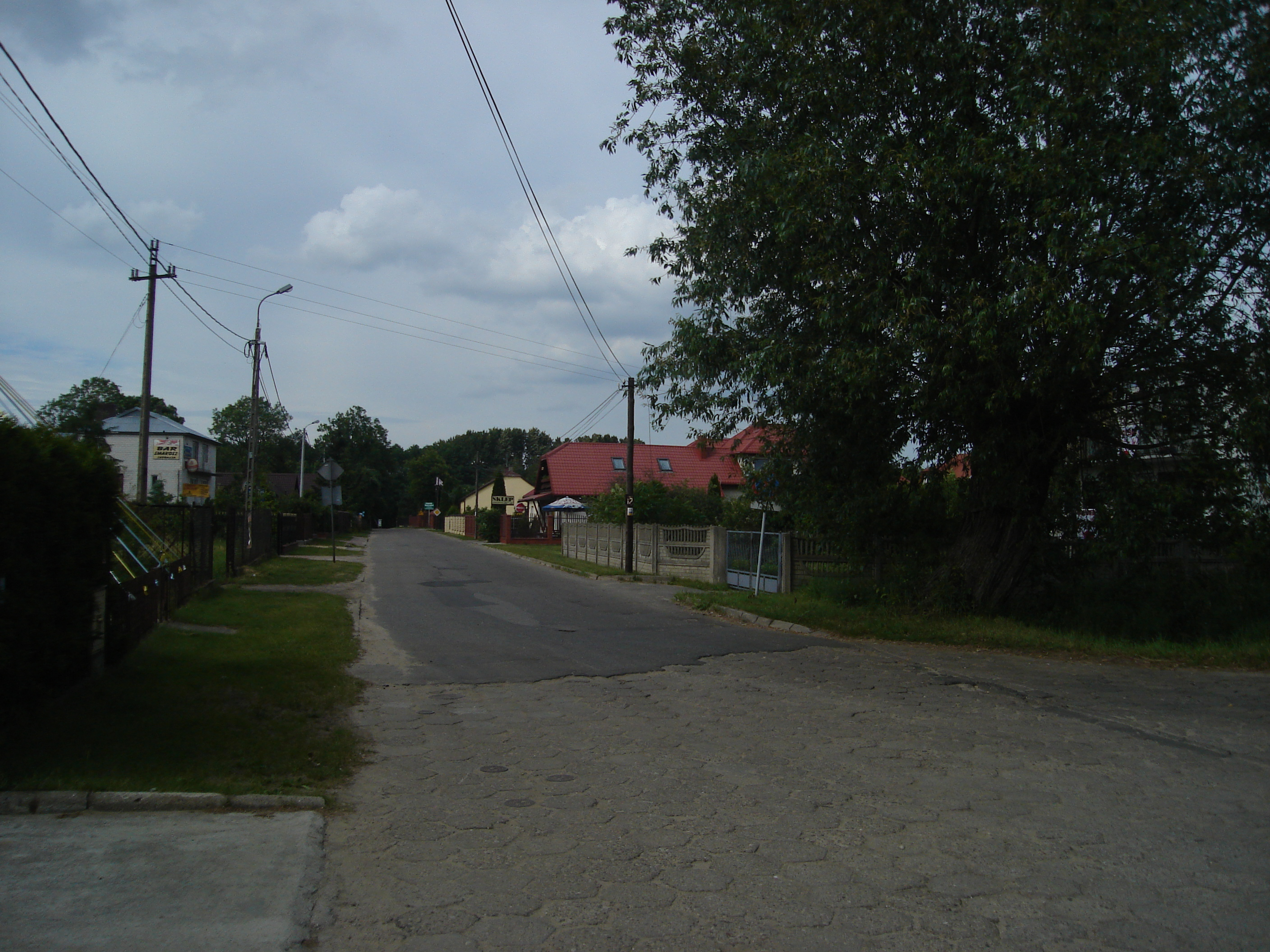

- Location within Poland
- Coordinates: 52°28′23″N 21°4′9″E
- Country: Poland
- Voivodeship: Masovian
- County: Legionowo
- Gmina: Nieporęt
- Population: 254

Rynia [ˈrɨɲa] is a village in the administrative district of Gmina Nieporęt, within Legionowo County, Masovian Voivodeship, in east-central Poland.
