= Gmina Serock =

Gmina Serock Serock Commune
- Gmina
- Flag Coat of arms
- Interactive map of Gmina Serock
- Coordinates (Serock): 52°30′47″N 21°4′10″E
- Country: Poland
- Voivodeship: Masovian
- County: Legionowo
- Seat: Serock

Area
  - Total: 108.96 km^{2} (42.07 sq mi)

Population (2013)
  - Total: 13,676
  - Density: 125.51/km^{2} (325.08/sq mi)
  - Urban: 4,130
  - Rural: 9,546
- Website: http://www.serock.pl

Gmina Serock is an urban-rural gmina (administrative district) in Legionowo County, Masovian Voivodeship, in east-central Poland. Its seat is the town of Serock, which lies approximately 17 kilometres (11 mi) north-east of Legionowo and 34 km (21 mi) north of Warsaw.

The gmina covers an area of 108.96 square kilometres (42.1 sq mi), and as of 2006 its total population is 11,236 (out of which the population of Serock amounts to 3,721, and the population of the rural part of the gmina is 7,515).

== Villages ==
Apart from the town of Serock, Gmina Serock contains the villages and settlements of Bolesławowo, Borowa Góra, Cupel, Dębe, Dębinki, Dosin, Gąsiorowo, Guty, Izbica, Jachranka, Jadwisin, Kania Nowa, Kania Polska, Karolino, Łacha, Ludwinowo Dębskie, Ludwinowo Zegrzyńskie, Marynino, Nowa Wieś, Skubianka, Stanisławowo, Stasi Las, Święcienica, Szadki, Wierzbica, Wola Kiełpińska, Wola Smolana, Zabłocie, Zalesie Borowe, Zegrze and Zegrzynek.

== Neighbouring gminas ==
Gmina Serock is bordered by the gminas of Nasielsk, Nieporęt, Pokrzywnica, Pomiechówek, Radzymin, Somianka, Wieliszew, Winnica and Zatory.
