= Serock =

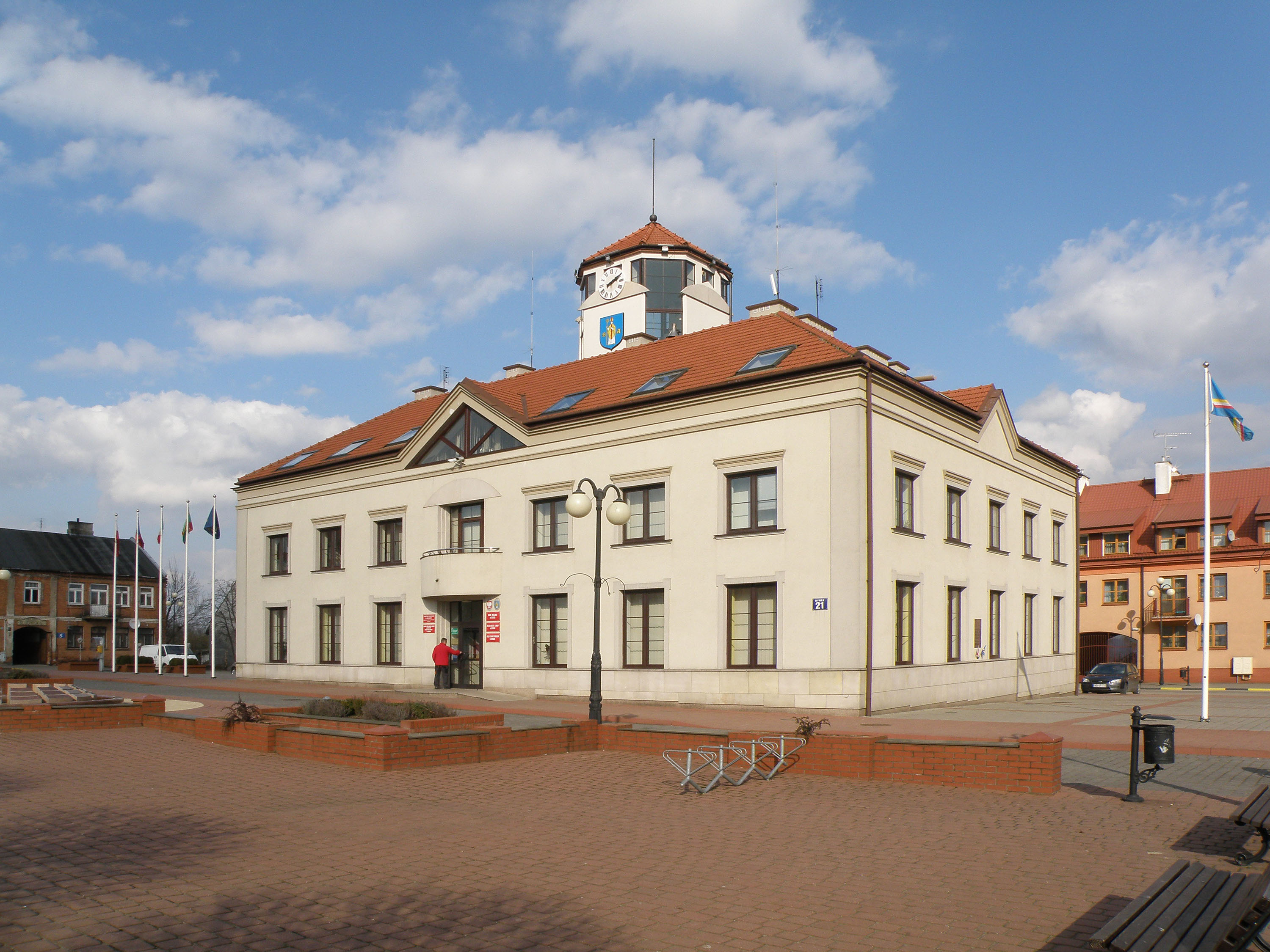
- Town hall

- Flag Coat of arms

- Location within Poland
- Coordinates: 52°30′47″N 21°4′10″E
- Country: Poland
- Voivodeship: Masovian
- County: Legionowo
- Gmina: Serock
- Established: 10th century
- Town rights: 1417, 1923

Government
  - Mayor: Artur Borkowski

Area
  - Total: 13.43 km^{2} (5.19 sq mi)
- Elevation: 110 m (360 ft)

Population (2021)
  - Total: 4,755
  - Density: 354.1/km^{2} (917.0/sq mi)
- Time zone: UTC+1 (CET)
  - Summer (DST): UTC+2 (CEST)
- Postal code: 05-140
- Area code: +48 22
- Car plates: WL
- Website: http://www.serock.pl

Serock [ˈsɛrɔt͡sk] is a town at the north bank of the Zegrze lake in the Legionowo County, Masovian Voivodeship, in central Poland, around 40 kilometres (25 miles) north of Warsaw. It has 4,109 inhabitants (2013).

== History ==
The stronghold was founded in the 10th century, shortly after the creation of the Polish state by the Piast dynasty. The first mention of the settlement dates from 1065 with the so-called "Falsyfikat mogileński," a document from the Benedictine monastery in Mogilno. The town is situated on the route which was the trade route leading from Gdańsk and Truso to Rus'.

Between 1113 and 1124, Serock was also mentioned in a list as one of the most important princely castles of Mazovia, which operated a river crossing (the Bug and Narew rivers intersect beside Serock) with a customs house.

During the fragmentation of Poland into smaller provincial duchies, Serock became part of the Duchy of Masovia, still ruled by the founding Piast dynasty. In 1417, Serock was granted town rights under Chełmno law by Janusz I of Warsaw. By then it was already a craft and commercial center. From this period the urban layout was created in the form of the market square and the late Gothic church of the parish.

Serock was a royal town of the Polish Crown and county seat, administratively located in the Masovian Voivodeship in the Greater Poland Province. In the 15th and 17th century municipal courts were held there. From 1655 to 1660, during the Swedish invasion, the town was largely destroyed. After the Third Partition of Poland in 1795, it was located in the Prussian Partition. In 1807 it came under the possession of the short-lived Polish Duchy of Warsaw, and after its dissolution in 1815 it was part of so-called Congress Poland in the Russian Partition of Poland.

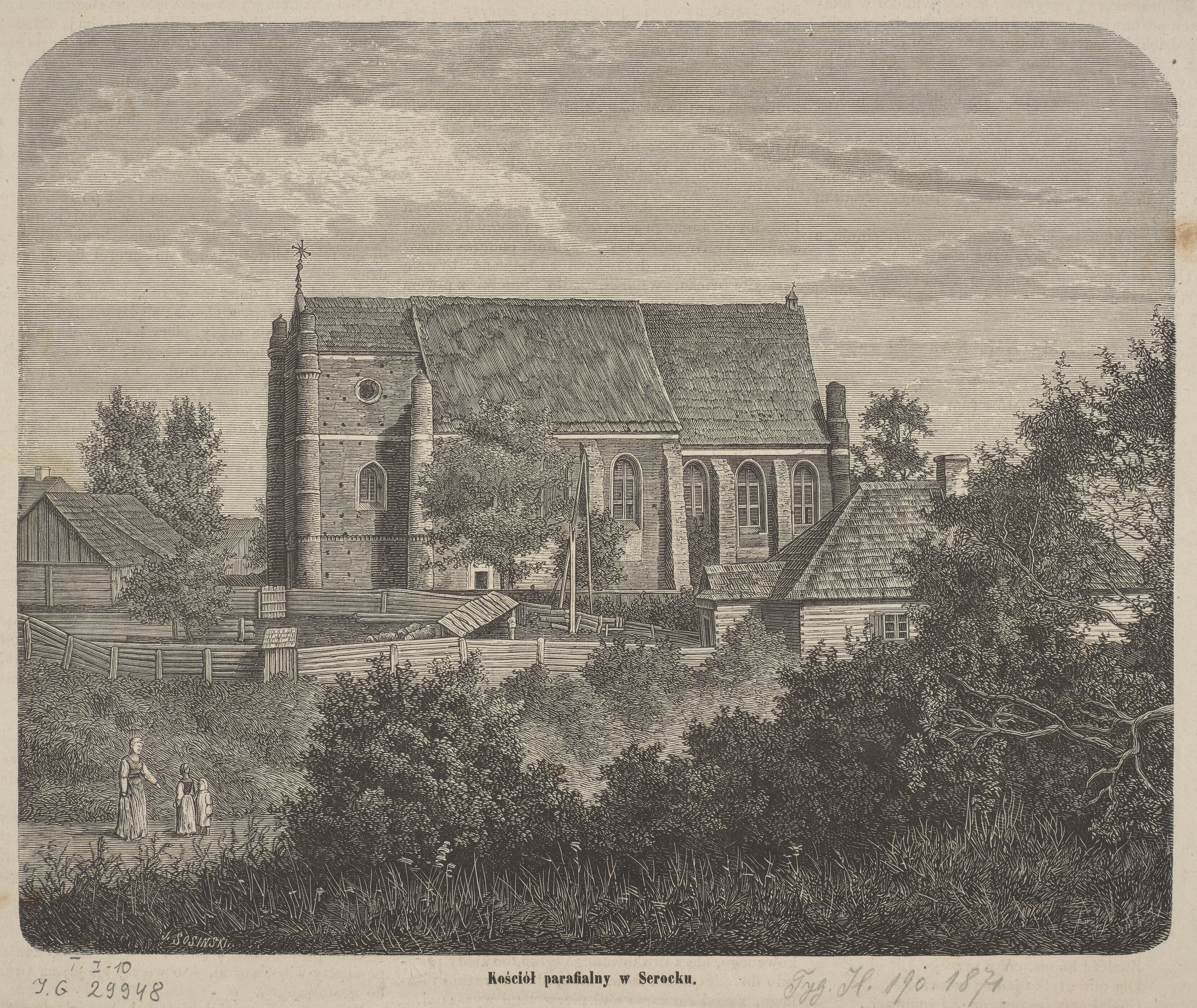
19th-century drawing of the Church of the Annunciation

Serock repeatedly was on the battle lines on the outskirts of Warsaw, including in 1794, 1809 and 1831. In 1806, on the orders of Napoleon I fortifications were built in Serock. From 1807 it was a fortress. During the Polish–Austrian war in 1809, it was the operational location of General Józef Niemojewski's troops. Then the fortress was expanded (at the initiative of the French Marshal Davout) until 1811, when it gained greater importance than Modlin Fortress. In 1831 the Polish army formed in Serock (during the November Uprising).

After the unsuccessful Polish January Uprising, Serock was deprived of town rights by the Russian administration in 1870, and entered a period of stagnation. Serock experienced a sizeable influx of Jews as a result of Russian discriminatory policies and the expulsion of Jews from Russian lands (see Pale of Settlement), however, many soon emigrated to the Americas. In the early 20th century Serock was a popular destination for Polish artists. During World War I it was occupied by Germany, and in 1918 local Poles disarmed the Germans, and Serock was reintegrated with Poland, which just regained independence. During the Polish–Soviet War, in 1920, the town was briefly occupied by the Soviet Russians, who destroyed the local Jewish library. The town rights were eventually restored in 1923.

=== World War II ===
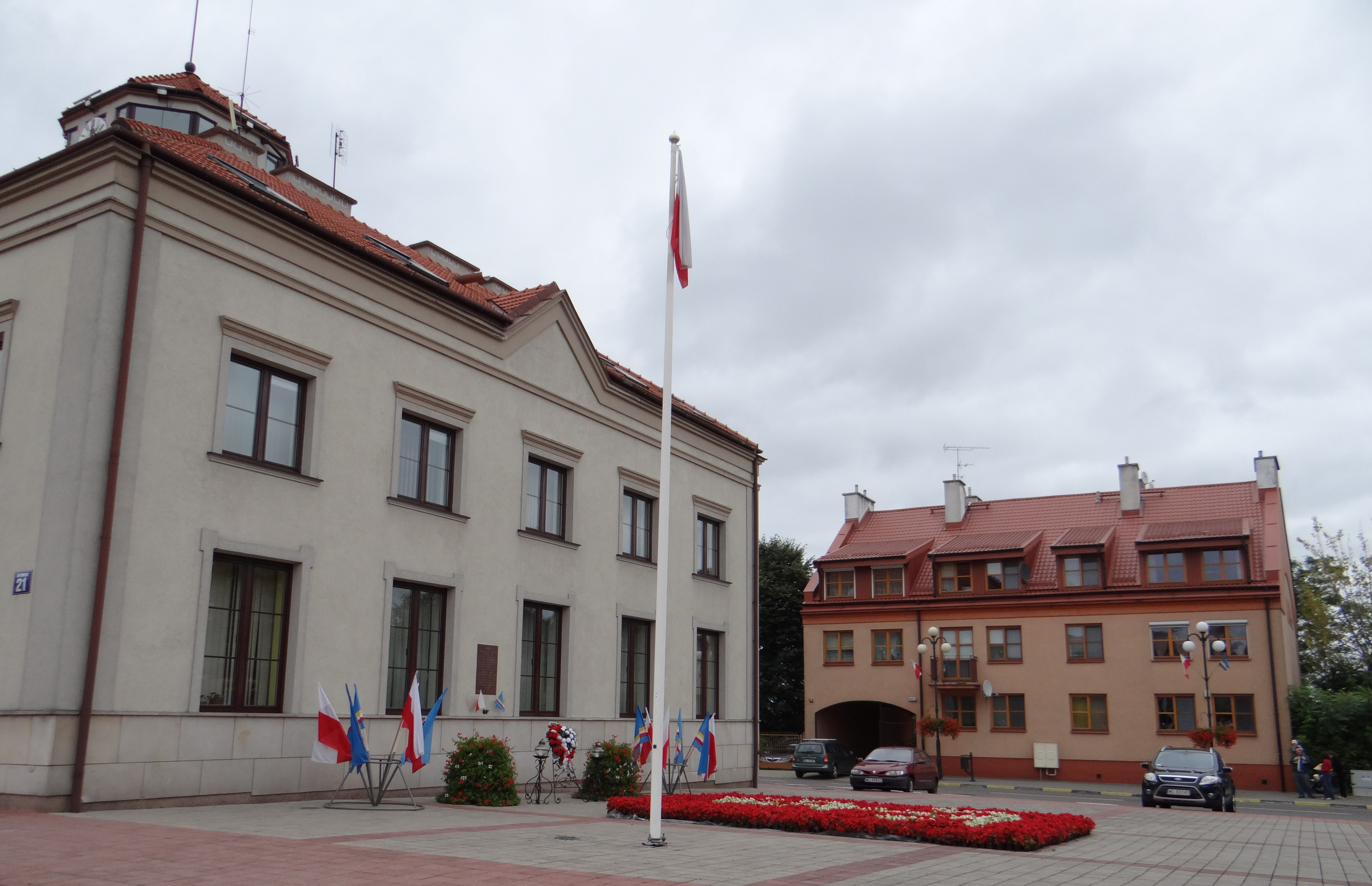
Memorial site to the inhabitants of Serock who died in the battles of World War I, the Polish–Soviet War and World War II, and those murdered in German and Soviet camps and prisons during World War II

In September 1939, Serock was a place of fighting between the Poles and the invading Germans during the Invasion of Poland, which started World War II. On September 5, 1939, around 50–70 people, both inhabitants of Serock and refugees from nearby Nasielsk, were killed in a German air raid. In mid-September 1939, the Einsatzgruppe V entered the town to commit atrocities against the population.

Under German occupation, Serock was annexed directly to the Third Reich, and the boundary between the Third Reich and the General Government proceeded along the Narew river. In autumn of 1939 the Germans carried out massacres of around 150 Poles from Serock in the nearby forest as part of the Intelligenzaktion. In December 1939, around 3,000 Jews were expelled from the town by the Germans. In April and October 1940, the Germans carried out mass arrests of hundreds of local Poles, many of whom were deported to concentration camps, and in spring of 1940, another 50 Poles were murdered in the nearby forest. In 1940–1941, the Germans expelled hundreds of Poles, who were then held in a camp in Działdowo and deported to the Kraków region in the General Government, while their houses, shops and workshops were handed over to German colonists as part of the Lebensraum policy. From 1940 to 1944 there was a forced labor camp there, the prisoners of which were mostly Poles from Serock and nearby villages, some of whom were afterwards deported to forced labour elsewhere. The Germans destroyed the Jewish cemetery.

The Polish resistance movement was active in the town, and secret Polish schooling continued. In February 1941, the Germans carried out an execution of 21 members of the Polish resistance movement. In 1942 the ghetto contained around 2,000 people.

In October 1944 the Eastern Front ran through the town. Germany defended from Serock across the Narew against the Red Army. The Russians launched a massive Katyusha rocket launcher attack resulting in Serock's destruction. The town was captured by the Red Army in October 1944, and afterwards restored to Poland. 55% of the buildings were destroyed, other were damaged.

Today there are no Jews. In the summer of 2000, a visiting descendant of former residents discovered that a number of gravestones (matzevot) were piled up in the city park. The stones had been gathered by a non-Jewish resident who roped off the area. In 2006, a visit by members of the Jewish Records Indexing-Poland project confirmed this and an attempt is under way to establish a memorial on the site of the former Jewish cemetery. The United States Commission for the Preservation of America's Heritage Abroad is involved in the project.

=== Recent times ===
In 1948 Serock was visited by Spanish artist Pablo Picasso. In 1963 the Zegrze Reservoir was formed, and Serock developed as a popular vacation destination for inhabitants of nearby Warsaw.

=== The model settlement Barbarka ===
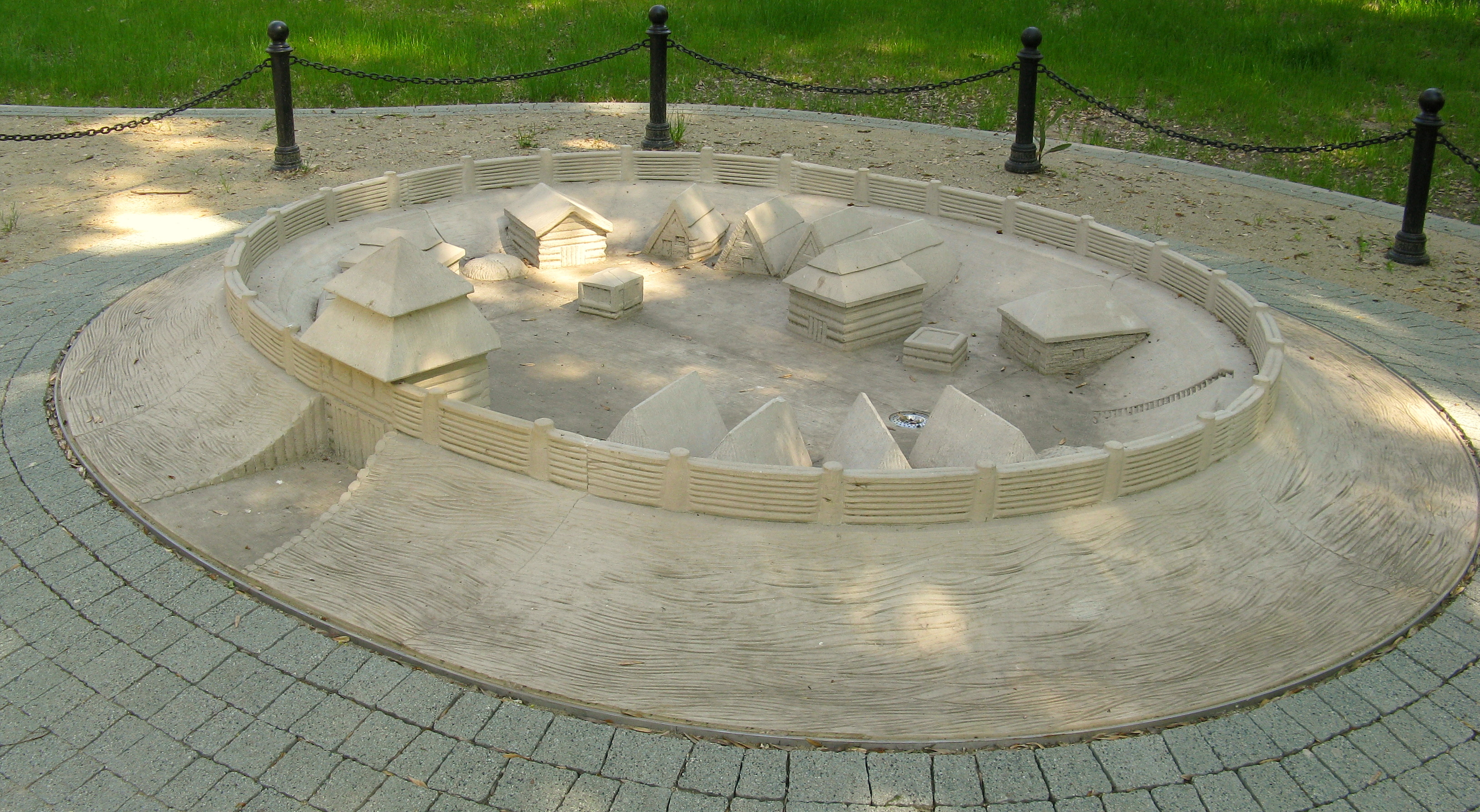
A model of the Barbarka settlement

An early medieval settlement called Ogrodziskiem or Barbarka was located on the right bank of the Narew river, near the mouth of the Bug river. Its development was from the 11th to 13th centuries. It represents one of the oldest castles in Mazovia.

The settlement was located on two trade and communication routes:

- To Rus: Nur, Brok, and Brańsk to Greater Poland, Kuyavia and Pomerania;
- From southern Poland to Yotvingia and Prussia.

During the tests conducted in 1961 by Prof. Dr. Zdzisław Rajewski, pieces of pottery, pugging (flooring) and parts of animal bones were found.

Excavations carried out from 1962 to 1966 by Barbara Zawadzka-Antosik showed three stages of the early settlement and human functioning in these areas in the 14th and 17th centuries. They also located the cemetery and a nave chapel with apse.

Approximately 200 archaeological sites were excavated consisting of, among others, fragments of pottery, animal bones and the remains of fish. They showed that the people mainly engaged in agriculture (cultivated wheat, rye, peas), fishing, weaving and craft work.

== Church of the Annunciation of the Blessed Virgin Mary ==
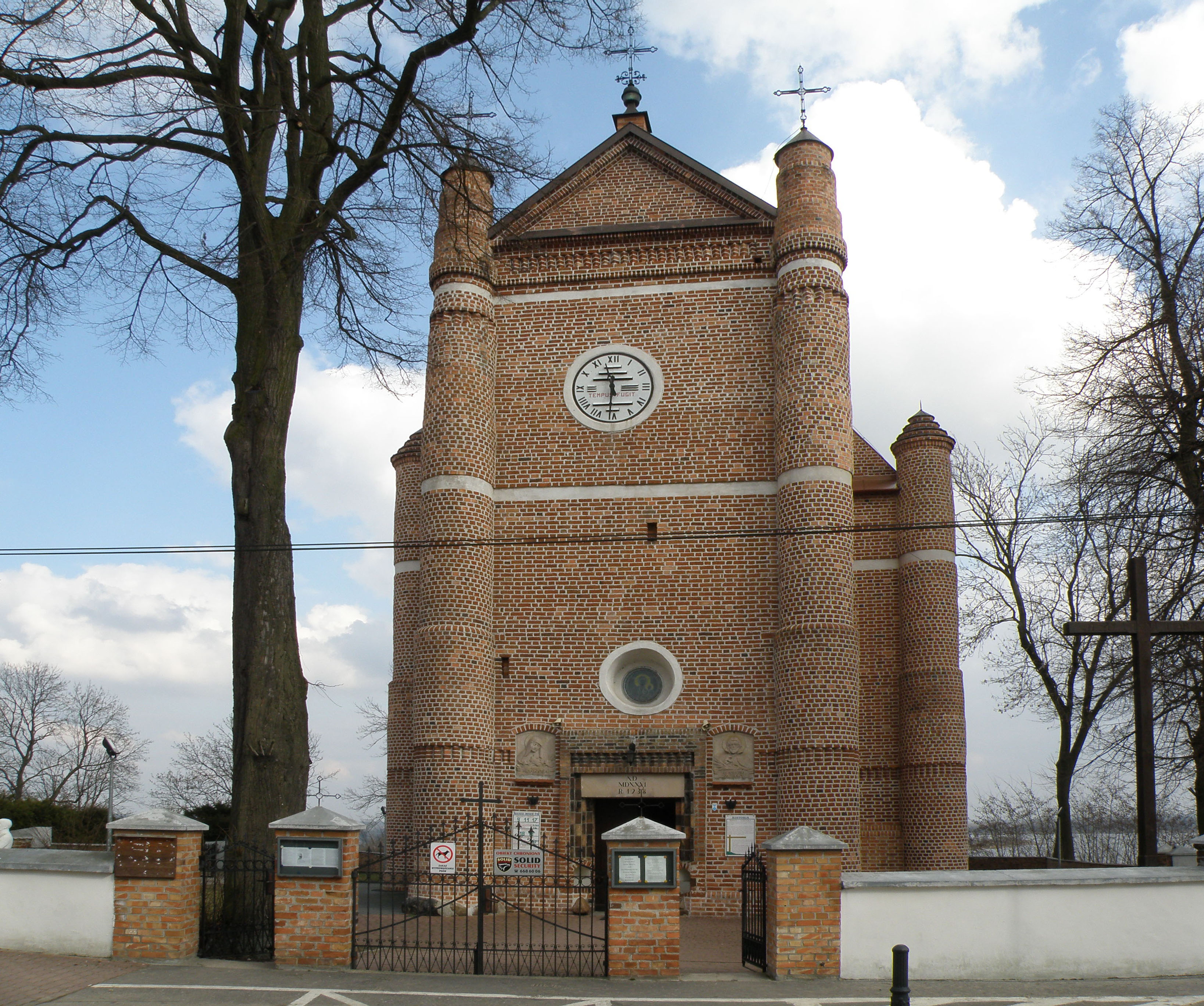
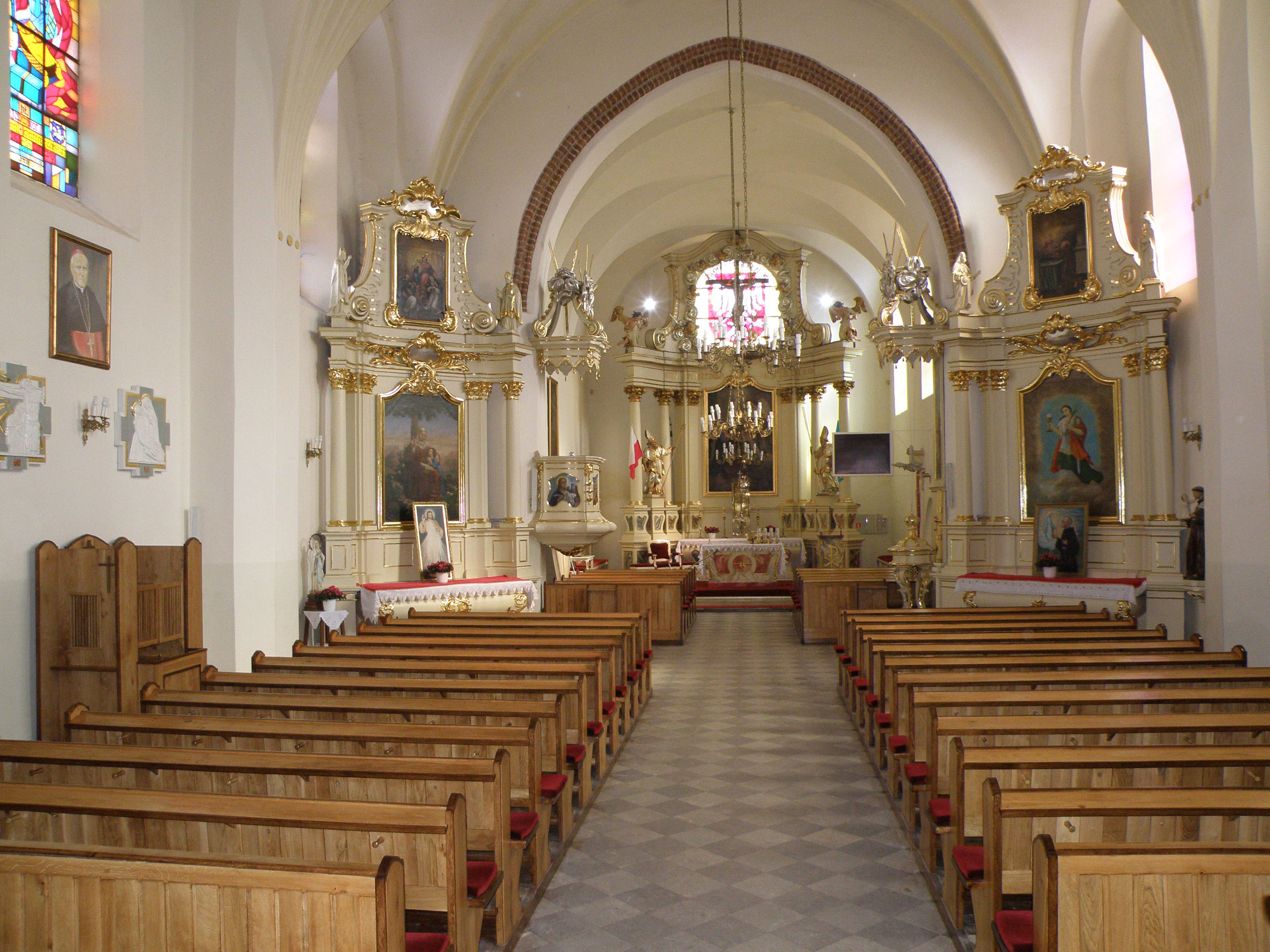
Church of the Annunciation of the Blessed Virgin Mary

The brick, one-nave church of the Annunciation of the Blessed Virgin Mary (Kościół Zwiastowania Najświętszej Maryi Panny) – formerly St. Adalbert's (św. Wojciecha) – was founded by the dukes of Mazovia: Janusz III and Stanislaus. The initiator was a Serock pastor Wojciech Popielski of Popielżyna. The church was built between the first quarter and the end of the 16th century. In the 3rd quarter of the 18th century, the window was rebuilt. It has been restored many times, notably from 1934 to 1938.

The church has a floor positioned below the level of the environment, a simple closed chancel, two symmetrically placed vestries, a three-bay nave, and a tower. It was built on a thread cross. The vaults of the nave barrel vault with lunettes of the star superimposed on grid ribs. On the eastern slope is the inscription IH1586.

There is a picture showing Stanislas Witold Bienias' Battle of Warsaw in 1920 as well as original baroque items such as:

- the main altar, which shows the Annunciation of the Blessed Virgin Mary
- sculptures of St. Adalbert and St. Stanislaus
- side altar of St. Anne
- side altar of St. Barbara
- a font

In 1961, the church was entered in the Polish register of monuments.

== Industry ==
In Serock there are small service and manufacturing industries. Goods manufactured here are mainly food, electrical engineering, ceramics, furniture and equipment. Around the town, strawberries and vegetables are grown.

== Tourism ==
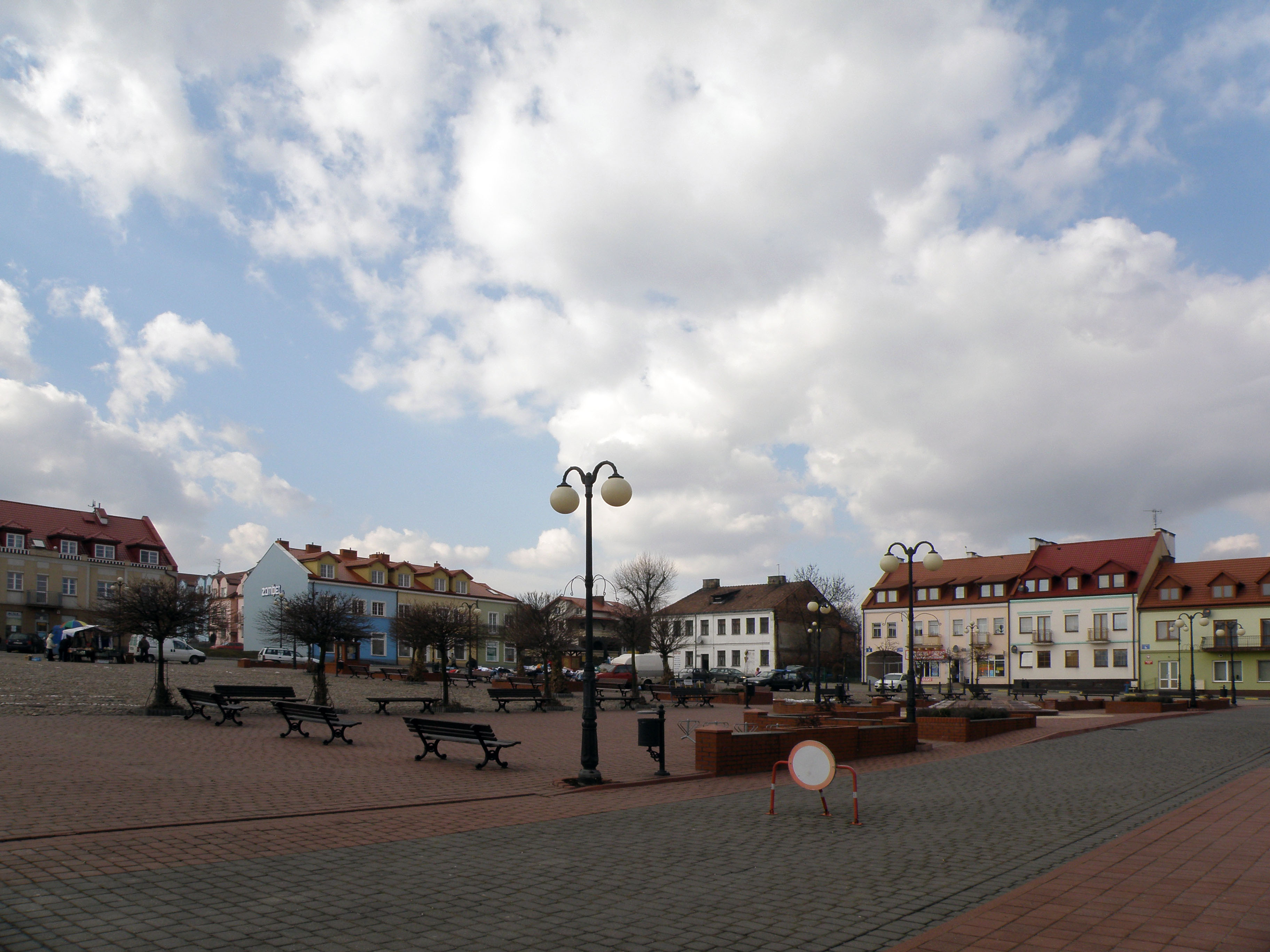
Rynek (Market Square)

Serock is a recreational and relaxation site. Holiday resorts and conference and training centres are located here or nearby. There is also a haven for passenger shipping. There are numerous organised hiking trails, including the road brook and ravine at the top of the Barbarka. Through the village runs the tourist walking trail from Dębe. As a result of the damming of the Bug and Narew rivers, conditions are ideal for water sports and fishing. There are approximately 4,500 recreational homes in the area.

The location is also a center of culture and sport. There's a lot of organised cultural events, including the International Folklore Review Kupalnocka (including experienced teams from Taiwan, Russia, Lithuania, Bulgaria, Chile, Romania, Slovakia, Sweden, Greece, Egypt, Italy, France, Turkey, Canada, Croatia, and the Netherlands) and Serock Summer Music (including vocal and instrumental concerts at the top of Barbarka).

== Transport ==
National roads 61 and 62 bypass Serock to the west.

The nearest railway station is in Zegrze Południowe to the south. New line connecting the city as a part of North Mazovia Railway is planned.

Serock has bus connections to Legionowo and Pułtusk.

== Twin towns – sister cities ==
- Celleno, Italy
- Dzierżoniów, Poland
- Ignalina, Lithuania
- Lanškroun, Czech Republic
- Radzionków, Poland
- Balatonalmádi, Hungary
- Opishnia, Ukraine
- Velykyi Bychkiv, Ukraine
- Dryanovo, Bulgaria
