= Dębe, Legionowo County =

Dębe
- Village
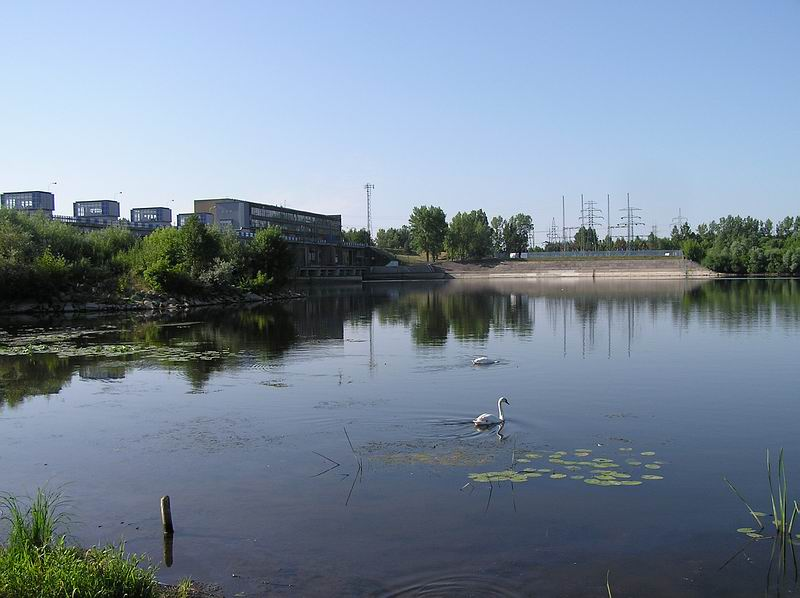
- Dębe Power Plant

- Location within Poland
- Coordinates: 52°29′N 20°55′E
- Country: Poland
- Voivodeship: Masovian
- County: Legionowo
- Gmina: Serock

Dębe [ˈdɛmbɛ] is a village in the administrative district of Gmina Serock, within Legionowo County, Masovian Voivodeship, in east-central Poland.
