= Gmina Jabłonna, Masovian Voivodeship =

Gmina Jabłonna Jabłonna Commune
- Gmina
- Coat of arms
- Interactive map of Gmina Jabłonna
- Coordinates (Jabłonna): 52°22′40″N 20°54′59″E
- Country: Poland
- Voivodeship: Masovian
- County: Legionowo
- Seat: Jabłonna

Area
  - Total: 64.55 km^{2} (24.92 sq mi)

Population (2013)
  - Total: 17,531
  - Density: 271.6/km^{2} (703.4/sq mi)
- Website: https://www.jablonna.pl

Gmina Jabłonna is a semi-rural gmina (administrative district) in Legionowo County, Masovian Voivodeship, in east-central Poland. Its seat is the village of Jabłonna, which lies approximately 3 kilometres (2 mi) south of Legionowo and 19 km (12 mi) north of Warsaw.

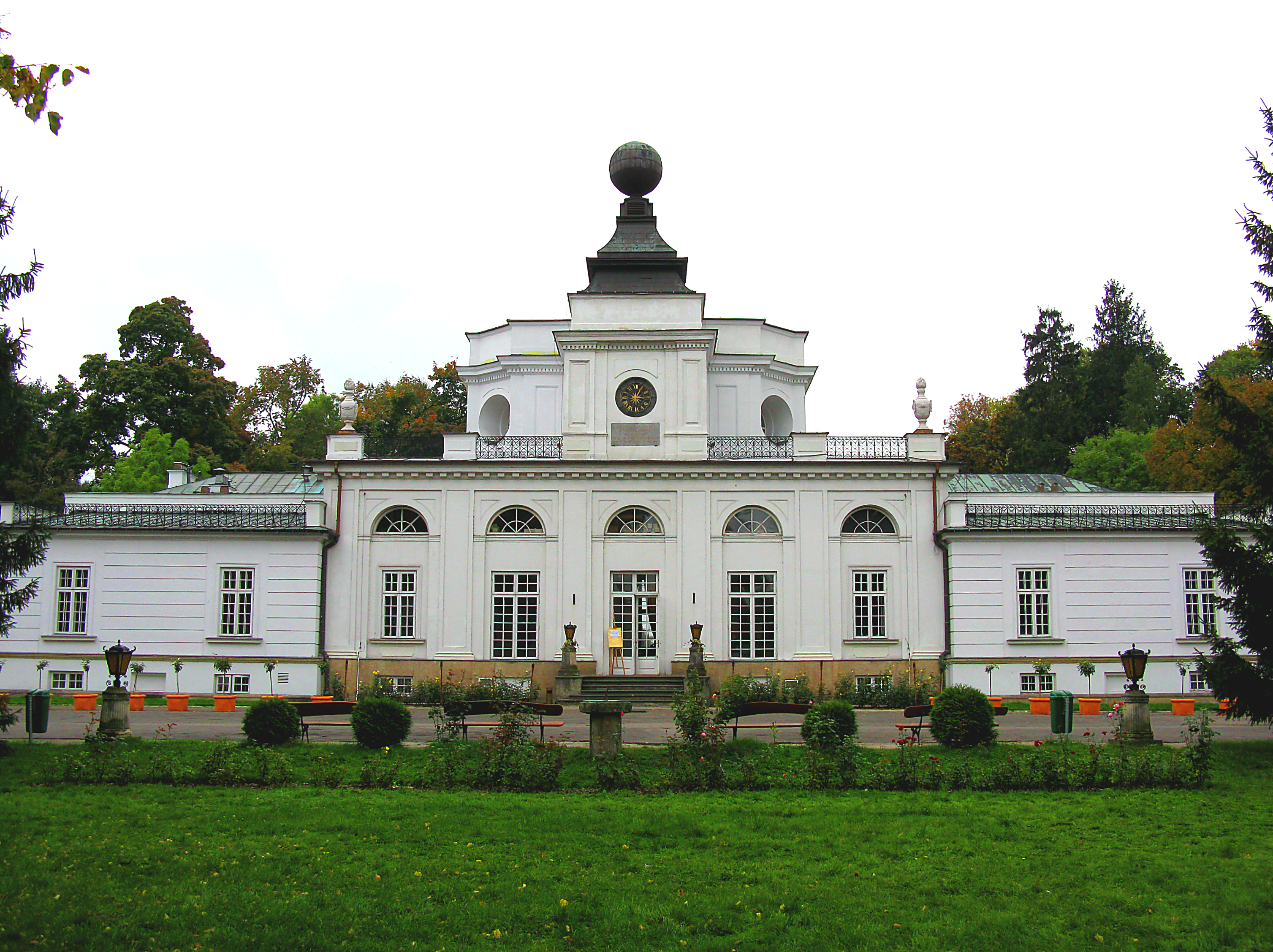

The gmina covers an area of 64.55 square kilometres (24.9 sq mi), and as of 2006 its total population is 13,172 (17,531 in 2013).

== Villages ==
Gmina Jabłonna contains the villages and settlements of Boża Wola, Chotomów, Dąbrowa Chotomowska, Jabłonna, Janówek Drugi, Rajszew, Skierdy, Suchocin, Trzciany and Wólka Górska.

== Neighbouring gminas ==
Gmina Jabłonna is bordered by Warsaw, by the towns of Legionowo and Nowy Dwór Mazowiecki, and by the gminas of Czosnów, Łomianki, Nieporęt and Wieliszew.
