= Nieporęt =

- Village
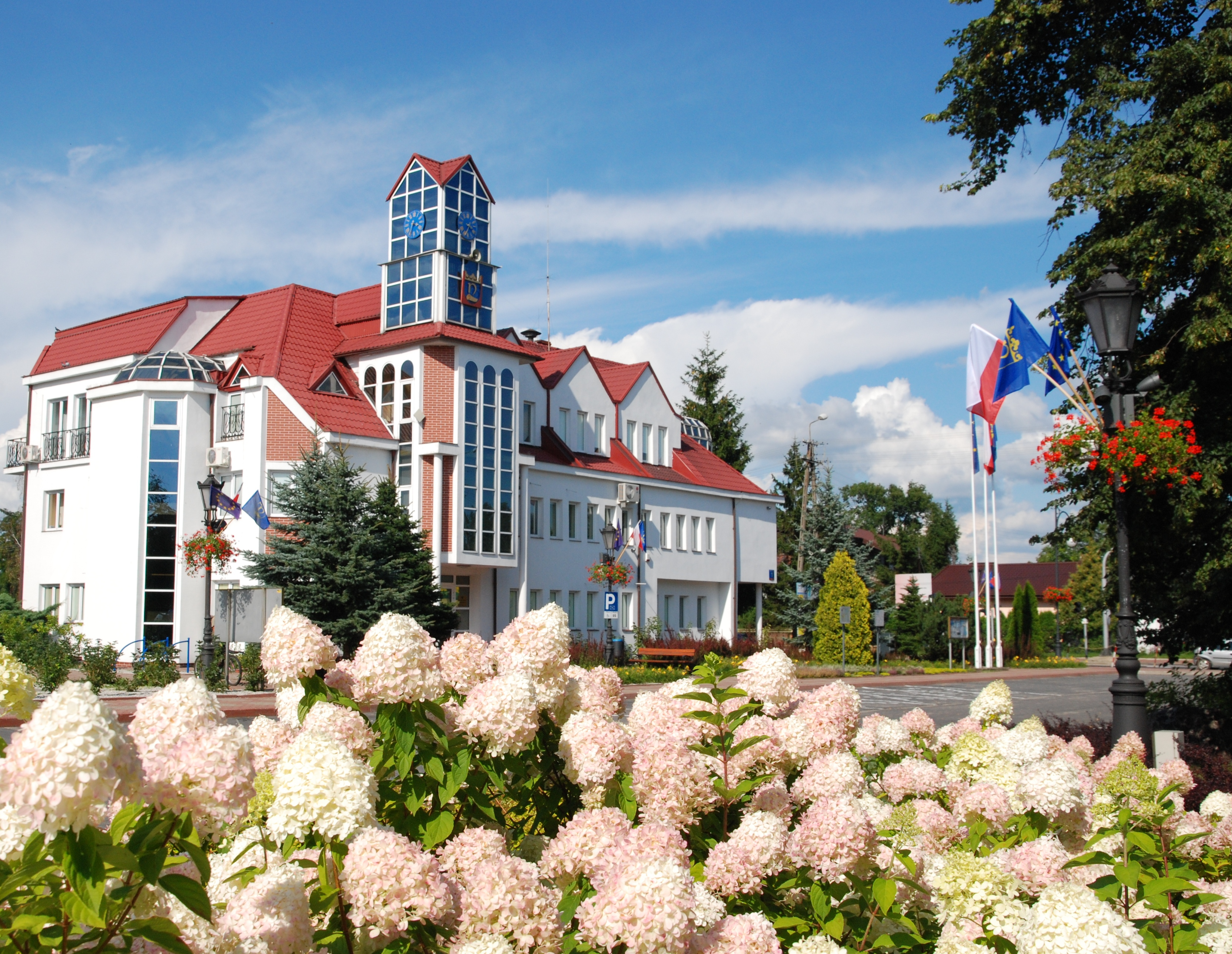
- Municipal office

- Coat of arms

- Location within Poland
- Coordinates: 52°25′28″N 21°2′1″E
- Country: Poland
- Voivodeship: Masovian
- County: Legionowo
- Gmina: Nieporęt
- Population: 3,239
- Website: http://www.nieporet.pl/

Nieporęt [ɲɛˈpɔrɛnt] is a village in Legionowo County, Masovian Voivodeship in east-central Poland. It is the seat of the gmina (administrative district) called Gmina Nieporęt.
