= Gmina Nieporęt =

Gmina Nieporęt Nieporęt Commune
- urban-rural municipality
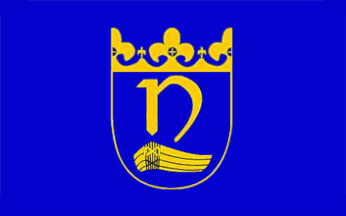
- Flag Coat of arms
- Interactive map of Gmina Nieporęt
- Coordinates (Nieporęt): 52°25′28″N 21°2′1″E
- Country: Poland
- Voivodeship: Masovian
- County: Legionowo
- Seat: Nieporęt

Area
  - Total: 100.52 km^{2} (38.81 sq mi)

Population (2013)
  - Total: 13,466
  - Density: 133.96/km^{2} (346.96/sq mi)
- Website: https://www.nieporet.pl/

Gmina Nieporęt is an urban-rural gmina (administrative district) in Legionowo County, Masovian Voivodeship, in east-central Poland. Its seat is the town of Nieporęt, which lies approximately 9 kilometres (6 mi) east of Legionowo and 24 km (15 mi) north of Warsaw

.

The gmina covers an area of 100.52 square kilometres (38.8 sq mi), and as of 2006 its total population is 12,908 (13,466 in 2013).

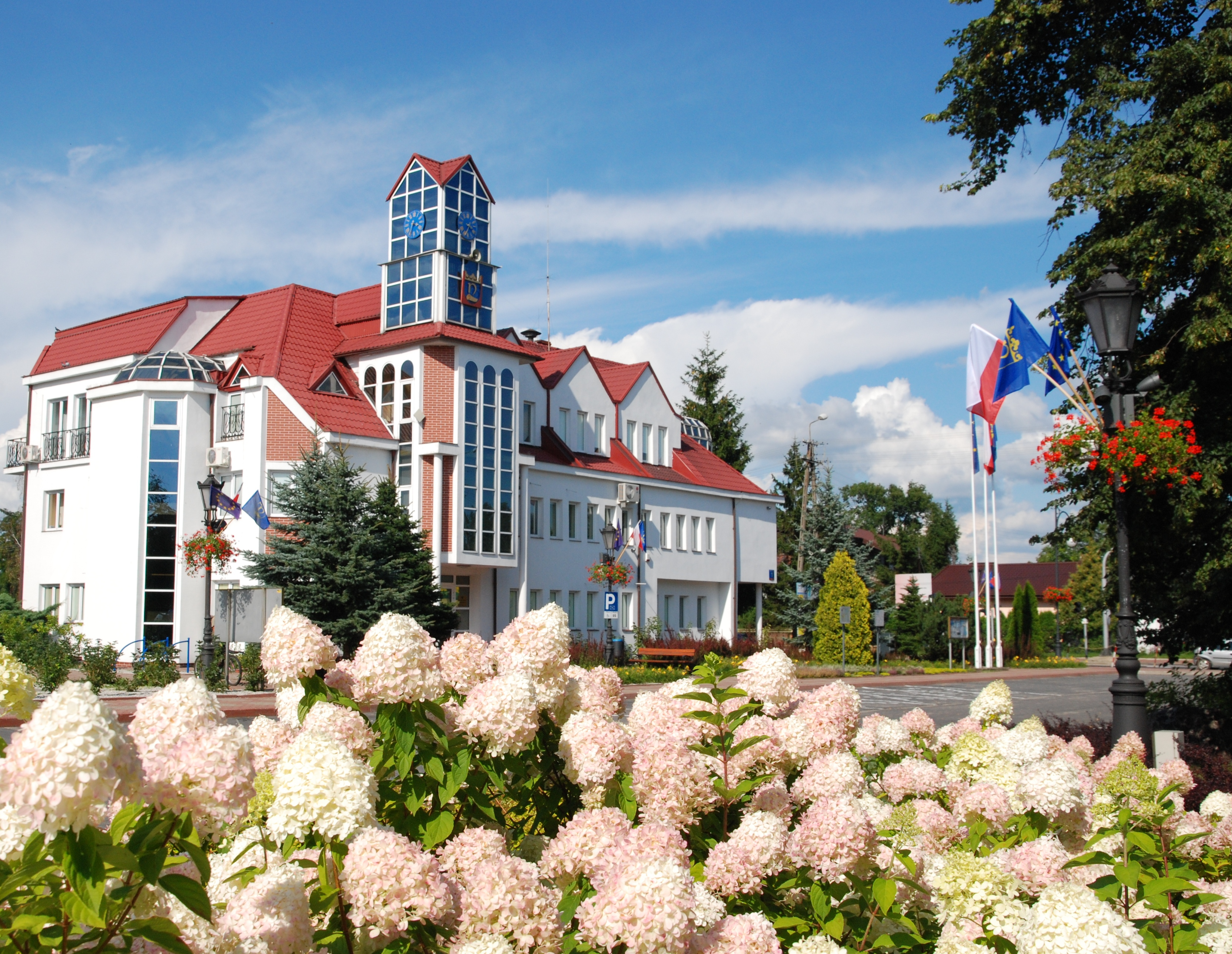
Ratusz w Nieporęcie

== Villages ==
Gmina Nieporęt contains the villages and settlements of Aleksandrów, Beniaminów, Białobrzegi, Izabelin, Józefów, Kąty Węgierskie, Michałów-Grabina, Rembelszczyzna, Rynia, Stanisławów Drugi, Stanisławów Pierwszy, Wola Aleksandra, Wólka Radzymińska and Zegrze Południowe.

== Neighbouring gminas ==
Gmina Nieporęt is bordered by Warsaw, by the towns of Legionowo and Marki, and by the gminas of Jabłonna, Radzymin, Serock and Wieliszew.
