= Legionowo County =

Legionowo County Powiat legionowski
- County
- Flag Coat of arms

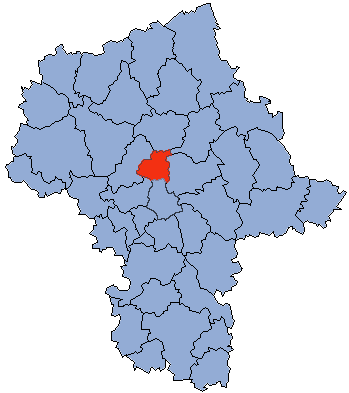
- Location within the voivodeship

- Division into gminas
- Coordinates (Legionowo): 52°24′N 20°55′E
- Country: Poland
- Voivodeship: Masovian
- Seat: Legionowo
- Gminas: Total 5 (incl. 1 urban): Legionowo; Gmina Jabłonna; Gmina Nieporęt; Gmina Serock; Gmina Wieliszew

Area
  - Total: 389.86 km^{2} (150.53 sq mi)

Population (2019)
  - Total: 106,321
  - Density: 272.72/km^{2} (706.33/sq mi)
  - Urban: 58,555
  - Rural: 47,766
- Car plates: WL
- Website: www.powiat-legionowski.pl

Legionowo County (Polish: powiat legionowski) is a unit of territorial administration and local government (powiat) in Masovian Voivodeship, east-central Poland. It came into being on 1 January 1999 as a result of the Polish local government reforms passed in 1998. Its administrative seat and largest town is Legionowo, which lies 22 kilometres (14 mi) north of Warsaw. The only other town in the county is Serock, lying 17 km (11 mi) north-east of Legionowo.

The county covers an area of 389.86 square kilometres (150.5 sq mi). As of 2019, its total population is 106,321, out of which the population of Legionowo is 54,049, that of Serock is 4,506, and the rural population is 47,766.

Legionowo is part of the greater Warsaw area and has a large commuter population. The train connection takes about 30 mins to central Warsaw (connection to Warsaw Metro at Warszawa Gdańska station) and is planned to be added to the Warsaw Rapid Train system by 2010. Both the road and the train connection pass through the national reserve forest which separates Legionowo from Warsaw and is a favorite weekend walk and biking destination. On the opposite side of Legionowo is the Zegrze Reservoir, created in 1970 with the building of a river dam, now a popular leisure destination.

The village of Jabłonna, between Legionowo and Warsaw, housed the largest population of private production and greenhouse businesses in communist times, making the village the richest in Poland at that time and continuing to this day in the form of a thriving business community.

Legionowo is also famous throughout Poland for its police training college.

== Neighbouring counties ==
Legionowo County is bordered by Pułtusk County to the north, Wyszków County and Wołomin County to the east, the city of Warsaw and Warsaw West County to the south, and Nowy Dwór County to the west.

== Administrative divisions ==
The county is subdivided into five gminas (one urban, one urban-rural and three rural). These are listed in the following table, in descending order of population.

Gmina	Type	Area (km^{2})	Population (2019)	Seat
Legionowo	urban	13.6	54,049	
Gmina Serock	urban-rural	109.0	14,924	Serock
Gmina Wieliszew	rural	102.2	14,701	Wieliszew
Gmina Nieporęt	rural	100.5	14,603	Nieporęt
Gmina Jabłonna	rural	64.6	8,044	Jabłonna
