= Battle of Ossów =

Coordinates: 52°18′41″N 21°14′38″E

- Part of the Polish–Soviet War
- Soviet assaults near Radzymin and Ossów of 14 August were bloodily repelled
Date	14 August 1920
Location	Ossów and Leśniakowizna near Warsaw, Poland
Result	Polish victory

Belligerents
Poland	Russian SFSR

Commanders and leaders
Kazimierz Sawicki	Grigory Khakhanyan

Strength
4 regiments	3 regiments

Casualties and losses
c. 600 (including c. 100 killed)	c. 600

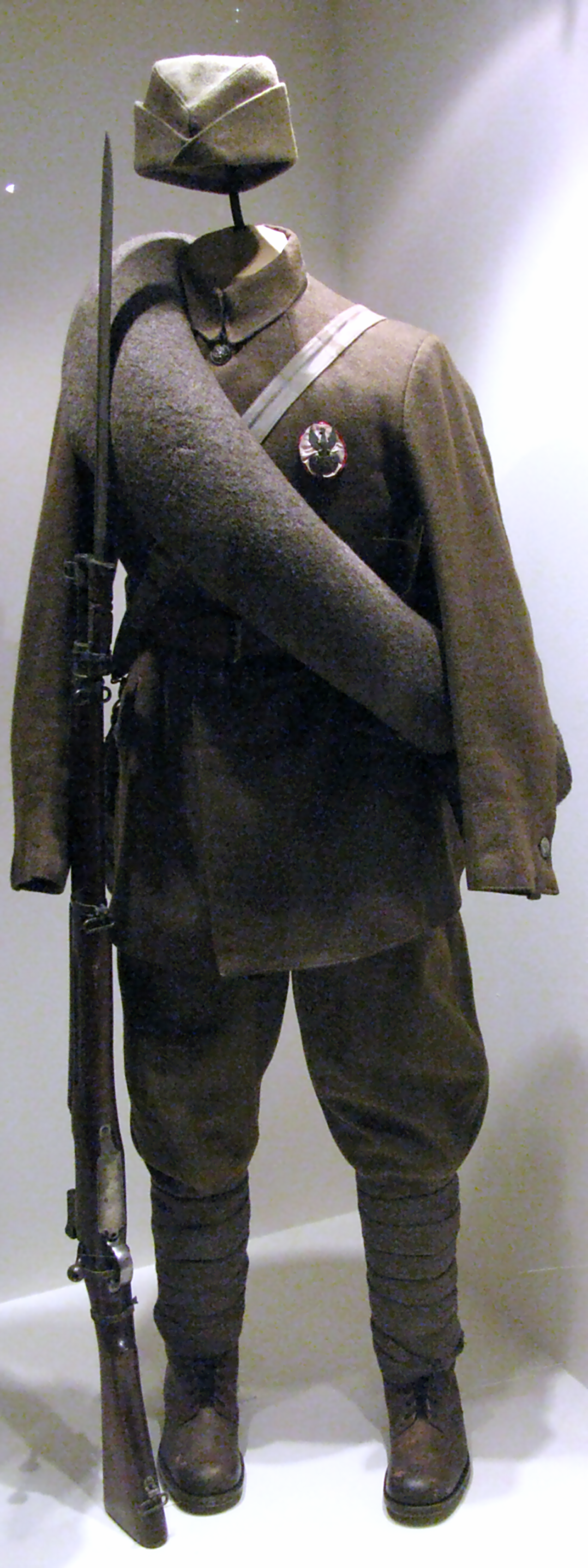
Uniform of the Polish Volunteer Army

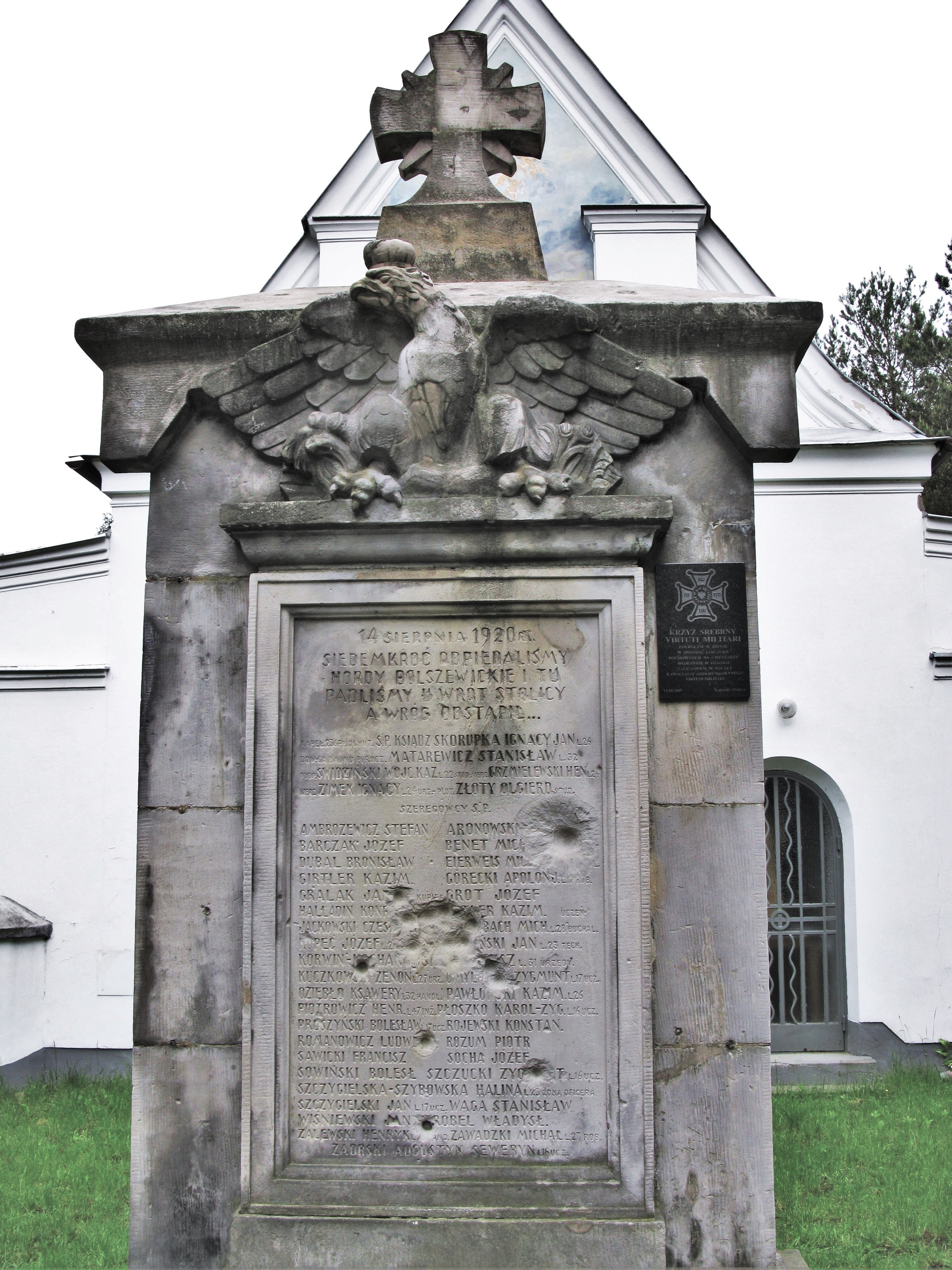
Monument to the fallen soldiers at the local cemetery in Ossów

The Battle of Ossów took place in the fields near Wołomin on 14 August 1920. It was a part of a much larger battle on the outskirts of Warsaw during the Polish-Bolshevist War (February 1919 - March 1921). During the day Soviet units managed to capture the strategically important village of Ossów, but were repelled in the evening by a Polish counter-attack. The battle was one of the first skirmishes won by the Poles since the beginning of the Soviet offensive in late spring.

== Battleground ==
The battle was fought as the Red Army forces commanded by Mikhail Tukhachevsky approached the Polish capital of Warsaw and nearby Modlin Fortress. The village of Ossów lay on a strategically important road leading from Warsaw towards Stanisławów and was considered crucial for both sides of the conflict. However, the retreat from the Bug River line left Polish forces in disarray and there were barely any forces available to defend the area of Ossów.

In Polish plans, the Leśniakowizna-Ossów road was to be used as a means of retreat from the first line of defences towards Warsaw and the second line of trenches, located slightly to the west of Ossów itself.

== Forces ==
By mid-August the area was manned by the 18th Infantry Division, a battle-hardened and well-equipped, yet tarnished and overstretched formation. The village itself was defended by remnants of the 33rd and 36th Infantry Regiments of the Polish Army. The earlier unit was considered a high-morale regiment due to a large number of conscripts from the region of Mazovia. The latter unit was considered elite as it was an all-volunteer body drafted from among the students of various Warsaw-based universities, (hence it was nicknamed the Academic Legion).
Immediately before the battle, the two regiments were reinforced with the newly created 221st and 236th Infantry Regiments of the Volunteer Army: both understrength and under-equipped, the latter unit was composed in large part from volunteers of Warsaw's gymnasiums.

On the Russian side of the front, there were elements of the 79th Rifle Brigade and 2nd Rifle Division, commanded by Grigory Khakhanyan. In total, the Bolshevist commander had three regiments at his disposal, (the 235th, 366th and the 16th Infantry Regiments), with a cavalry corps of Gayk Bzhishkyan in reserve.

== Battle ==
During the day Soviet units managed to capture the strategically important village of Ossów, but were repelled in the evening by a Polish counter-attack. The battle was one of the first skirmishes won by the Poles since the beginning of the Soviet offensive in late spring.

== Aftermath ==
The death of chaplain Ignacy Skorupka during the Polish counter-attack became one of the symbols of the war.
