= Pole and Hungarian brothers be =

Polish/Hungarian proverb

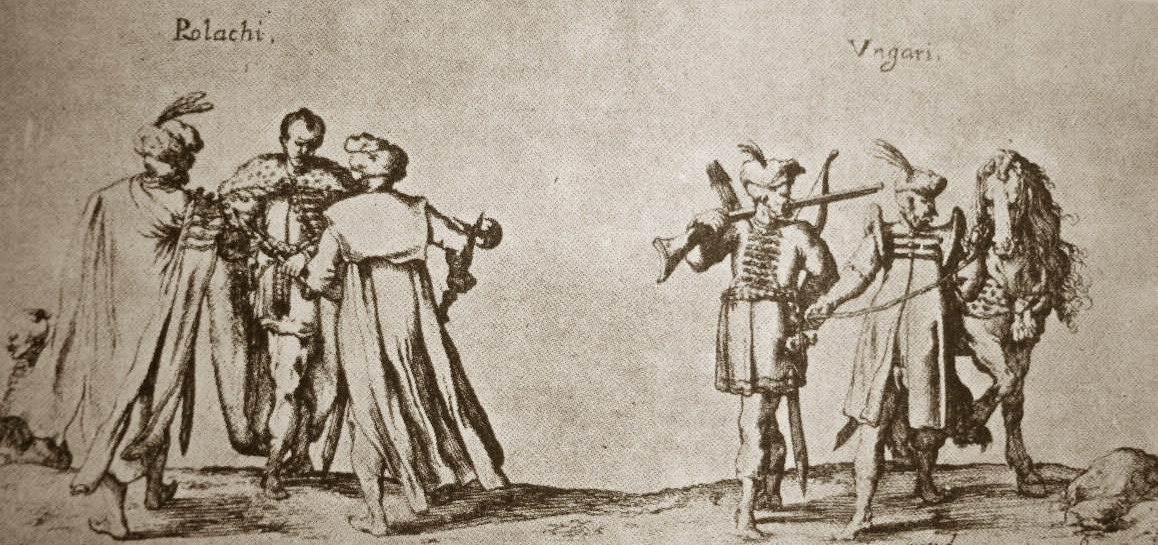
Poles and Hungarians, by Johann Wilhelm Baur (Czartoryski Museum, Kraków)

"Pole and Hungarian brothers be" (the Polish version) and "Pole and Hungarian, two good friends" (the Hungarian version) are English translations of a proverbial saying about the traditional brotherhood and camaraderie between Poles and Hungarians.

== Texts ==
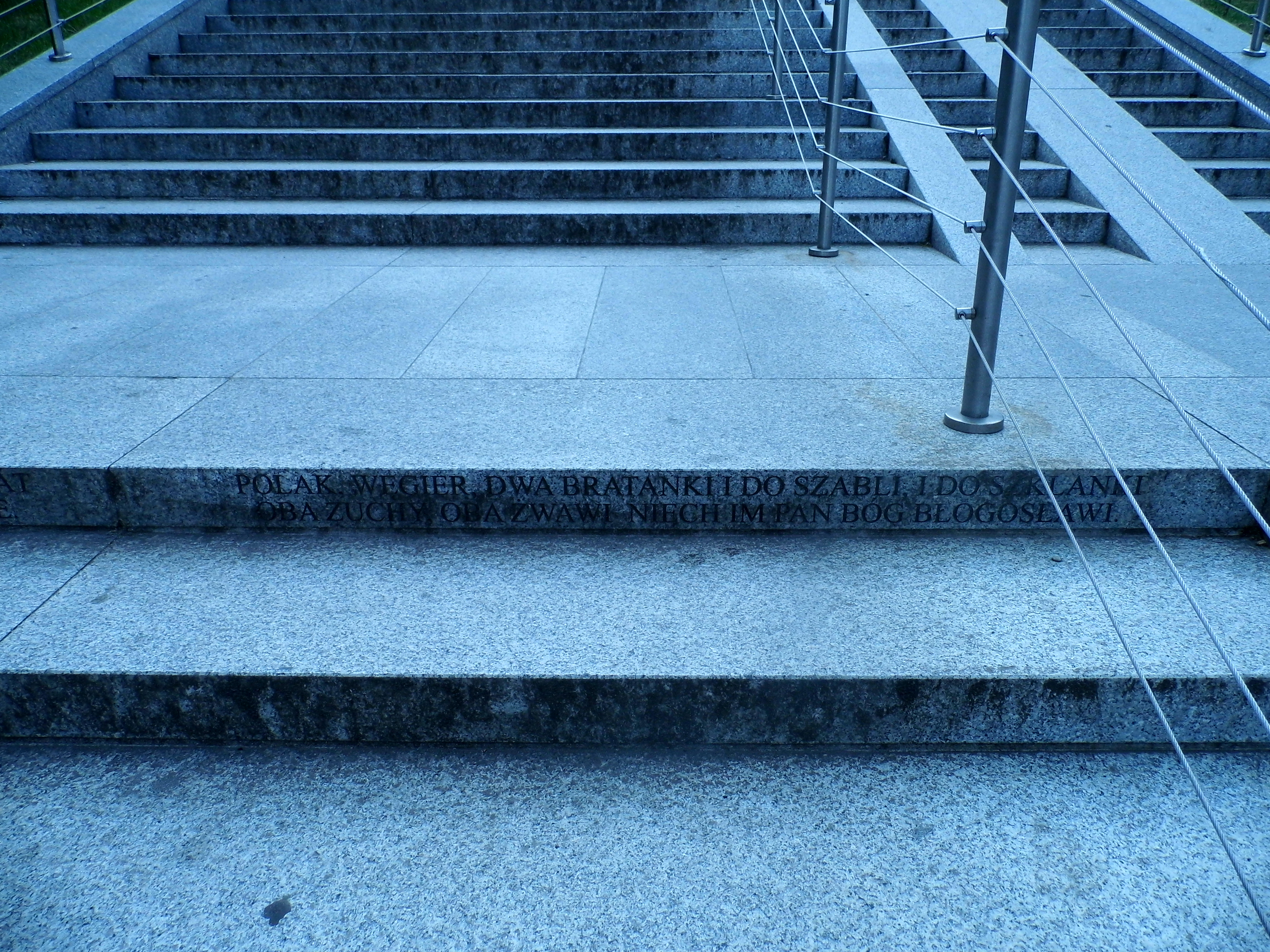
Polish-Hungarian friendship monument in Eger, Hungary, with the saying inscribed on its steps

The saying's Polish text reads

Polak, Węgier — dwa bratanki,
i do szabli, i do szklanki,
oba zuchy, oba żwawi,
niech im Pan Bóg błogosławi.

The full, two-couplet Hungarian version reads

Lengyel, magyar – két jó barát,
Együtt harcol s issza borát,
Vitéz s bátor mindkettője,
Áldás szálljon mindkettőre.

The Polish text may be translated

Pole and Hungarian brothers be,
good for fight and good for party.
Both are valiant, both are lively,
Upon them may God's blessings be.

or, more literally,

Pole and Hungarian — two brothers,
Both for saber and for glass.
Both courageous, both lively,
May the Lord God bless them.

A shorter Hungarian couplet

Lengyel, magyar – két jó barát,
együtt harcol s issza borát.

may be translated

Pole and Hungarian — two good friends,
fighting, and drinking at the end.

or, more literally,

Pole, Hungarian — two good friends,
together they battle and drink their wine.

The saying's Polish version has two couplets, each of the four lines containing eight syllables. The shorter Hungarian version has a single couplet, each of the two lines also consisting of eight syllables. The Polish bratanek (in modern parlance, "brother's son", or fraternal nephew) differs in meaning from the Hungarian barát ("friend"), though the words look similar. The Polish version is commonly quoted by Poles. The Hungarian language has 10 versions, most of which are two-line, eight-syllable couplets.

== History ==
=== Congeniality ===
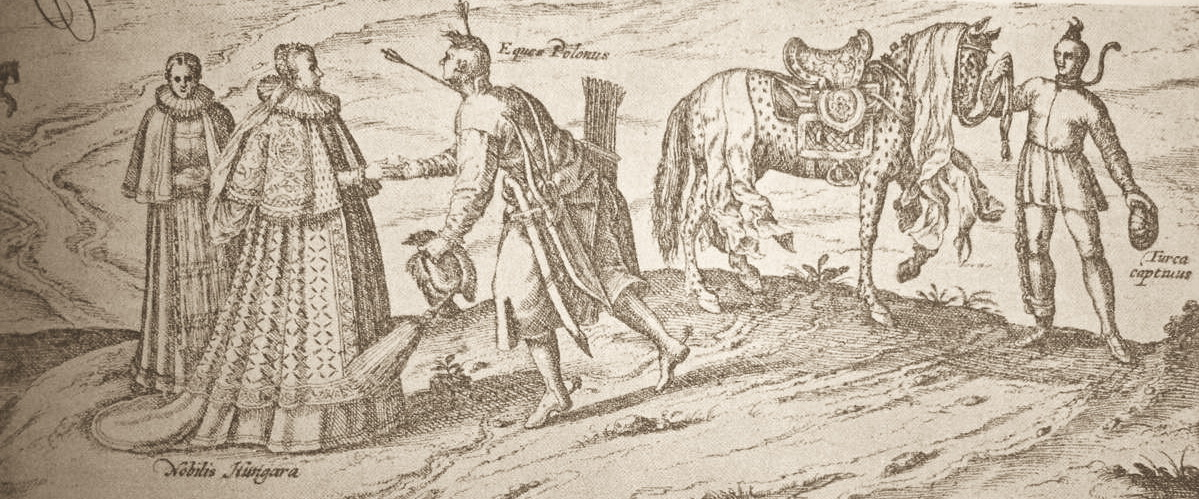
Polish Cavalryman and Hungarian Ladies, by Georg Haufnagel (Czartoryski Museum, Kraków)

The saying – a 16th- or 18th-century coinage by Polish szlachta (nobility) – reflects a long special relationship between Poland and Hungary. Poles and Hungarians considered themselves brothers in war and peace. They recognized that the two countries shared a similar political structure: a nobles' republic (the Polish Rzeczpospolita, the Hungarian natio Hungarica) with a democratic parliamentary system in which the state and king were controlled by a non-aristocratic noble class. The Polish word rokosz (a gathering to resist royal authority) derives from Hungary's Rákos, a field near Pest which was the medieval venue for mass meetings of Hungarian nobility.

The Poles recognized that both countries' noble classes had similar lifestyles, employed similar military tactics and weaponry, and shared common history, making them "brothers". When the Poles in 1576 elected the Hungarian Stephen Báthory (prince of Transylvania) king of Poland, he introduced military reforms, creating Poland's hussars and importing Poland's first saber-makers from Transylvania. In Poland, the szabla became known as the szabla węgierska ("Hungarian saber") or batorówka after King Stephen Báthory; it was subsequently called the zygmuntówka after Poland's King Sigismund III Vasa and the augustówka after King Augustus III.

The nobility of both countries enjoyed wine (imported to Poland primarily from Hungary during the Middle Ages), resulting in a similar temperament and lifestyle. In Hungary, the saying became widely known outside noble circles in the late 19th century. According to one source, the proverb's original Polish version was Węgier, Polak dwa bratanki i do szabli i do szklanki. Oba zuchy, oba żwawi, niech im Pan Bóg błogosławi.

The saying probably originated after the 1772 collapse of the Bar Confederation (1768–72), which had been formed to defend the Polish–Lithuanian Commonwealth from aggression by the Russian Empire. According to Julian Krzyżanowski, the saying was inspired by the political asylum in Szepesség, Kingdom of Hungary (present-day Spiš, Slovakia), of the confederation's leaders. According to another source, it "comes from the period when the Generality of the Bar Confederation (the Confederation's supreme authority) took up residence in Eperjes (now Prešov in eastern Slovakia) between 1769 and 1772".

=== Common interests ===
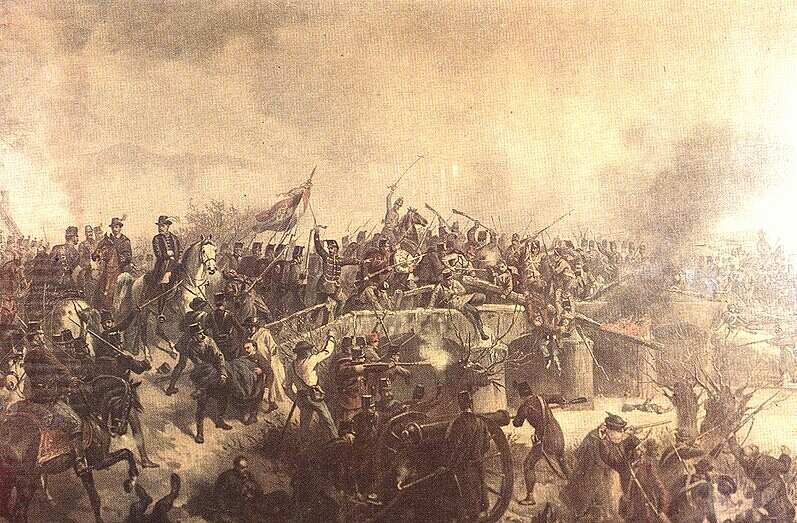
Battle of Piski in which Hungarians and Poles defeated the Austrians during the Hungarian War of Independence of 1848–1849

Future Polish King Władysław I the Elbow-high, fighting the Teutonic Order, found shelter at the courts of the Aba and Záh (Nógrád Castle) clans in Hungary. His family was guarded by Záh knights. Władysław married a Polish-Byzantine-Hungarian princess, Jadwiga of Kalisz. The daughter of Władysław and Maria of Bytom, Elżbieta, became queen of Hungary. Her son, Hungarian King Louis the Great, was also king of Poland, 1370–1382, after the death of his uncle, Polish King Casimir III the Great.

After the death of Louis the Great, his daughter Jadwiga became ruler of Poland, crowned "king" in Poland's capital, Kraków, on 16 October 1384. In 1440–1444, the two countries shared the same king again, after King Władysław III of Poland became also King of Hungary. At age twenty he was killed in the Battle of Varna, in which a coalition of Central and Eastern European countries led by Poland and Hungary was defeated by the Turks. From 1490 to 1526, both countries were ruled by separate but closely related branches of the Jagiellonian dynasty, after Polish Prince Władysław, son of Polish King Casimir IV Jagiellon, became King Vladislaus II of Hungary.

Polish-Hungarian relations became particularly close during the rule of the Jagiellonian dynasty in Poland and Hungary. The Polish historian Krzysztof Baczkowski, who analyzed Polish-Hungarian correspondence and personal encounters in the late 15th and the first half of the 16th century, concluded that with no other neighbour did the Poles have such "frequent and lively" contacts, which intensified with time and led to many strong friendships as well as mutual sociocultural, military, and legal influences.

In the 1576 Polish–Lithuanian royal election, a Hungarian nobleman, Stephen Báthory, was elected king of Poland.

In 1657, George II Rákóczi, the Prince of Transylvania, allied with Sweden and joined the invasion of the Polish–Lithuanian Commonwealth, managing to occupy large parts of southern Poland before ultimately being forced to retreat.

After the outbreak of the Polish November 1830 Uprising, Hungarians collected money for Polish insurgents and provided help and shelter to Polish refugees. Many of them also joined the ranks of the Polish rebels. During the Hungarian Revolution of 1848, some 10,000 Polish volunteers fought for Hungarian independence, and Polish General Józef Bem became a national hero of both countries.

During the Polish–Soviet War of 1919–21, Hungary offered to send 30,000 cavalry to Poland's aid; however, the Czechoslovak government refused them passage through the demilitarized zone which had existed between Czechoslovakia and Hungary since the Hungarian–Czechoslovak War of several months earlier. The Romanian government took a similar stance, also refusing passage. When the Hungarians tried to send ammunition trains, Czechoslovakia again refused but Romania agreed, provided the Hungarians used their own trains. Hundreds of Hungarian volunteers fought on Poland's side in the war, and some stayed in Poland afterward.

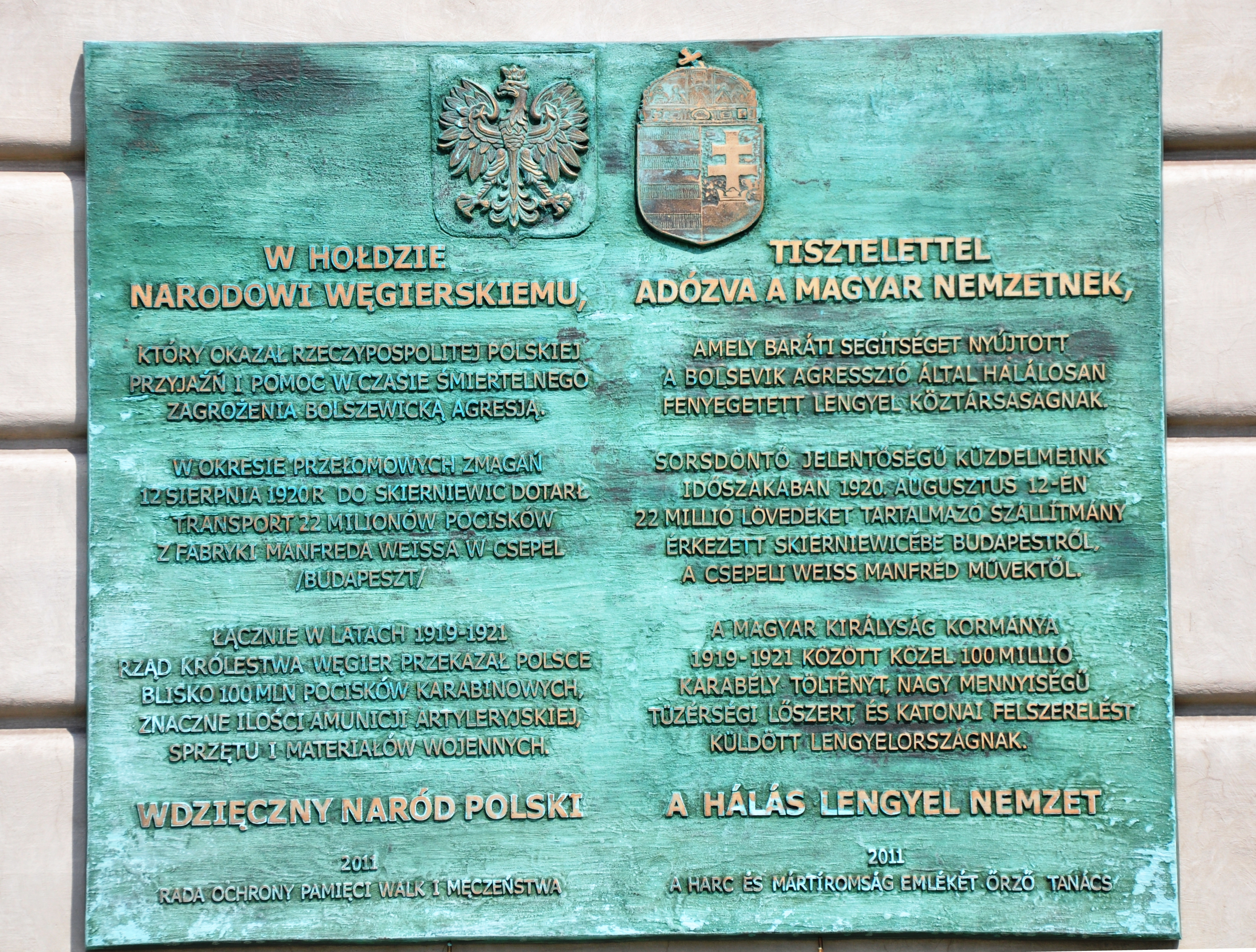
Plaque in Warsaw commemorating Hungarian aid to Poland during the Polish–Soviet War of 1919–21

From the Middle Ages into the 18th century, Poland and Hungary shared a border between Poland and Carpathian Ruthenia (also known as Carpathian Rus, were part of several Hungarian states). After World War I, the Allies transferred Carpathian Ruthenia from Hungary to Czechoslovakia. Poland never ratified the Treaty of Trianon. The treaty with Hungary was not signed until 4 June 1920, did not become effective until 26 July 1921, and was never published in Poland's Journal of Laws.

After the 30 September 1938 Munich Agreement (which fatally wounded Czechoslovakia and, after the proclamation of the First Slovak Republic, led to the remainder of the country being taken over by Germany), Poland and Hungary worked through diplomatic and paramilitary means to restore their common border by engineering the return of Carpathian Ruthenia to Hungary. A step toward this goal was realized with the 2 November 1938 First Vienna Award.

Until mid-March 1939, Germany had considered a restored Hungarian-Polish frontier, for military reasons, undesirable. In March 1939, however, in response to Hungary's lobbying, Hitler changed his mind about a common Hungarian-Polish frontier and decided instead to betray Germany's ally, the Organization of Ukrainian Nationalists, who had begun organizing Ukrainian military units in 1938 in a sich outside Uzhhorod, the capital of Subcarpathian Rus', which had been restyled Carpatho-Ukraine. Hitler had been concerned that if a Ukrainian army, organized there, accompanied German forces invading the Soviet Union, Ukrainian nationalists would insist on an independent Ukraine. Polish political and military authorities, for their part, had seen the sich as an imminent danger to adjacent southeastern Poland, with its majority-Ukrainian population, and in October 1938 had launched paramilitary operations to assist Hungary in taking over the region, which Hungary had governed to the end of World War I. In March 1939, Hungary took over the remainder of Carpathian Ruthenia. At least 43 Ukrainian POW's were executed by Polish and Hungarian forces.

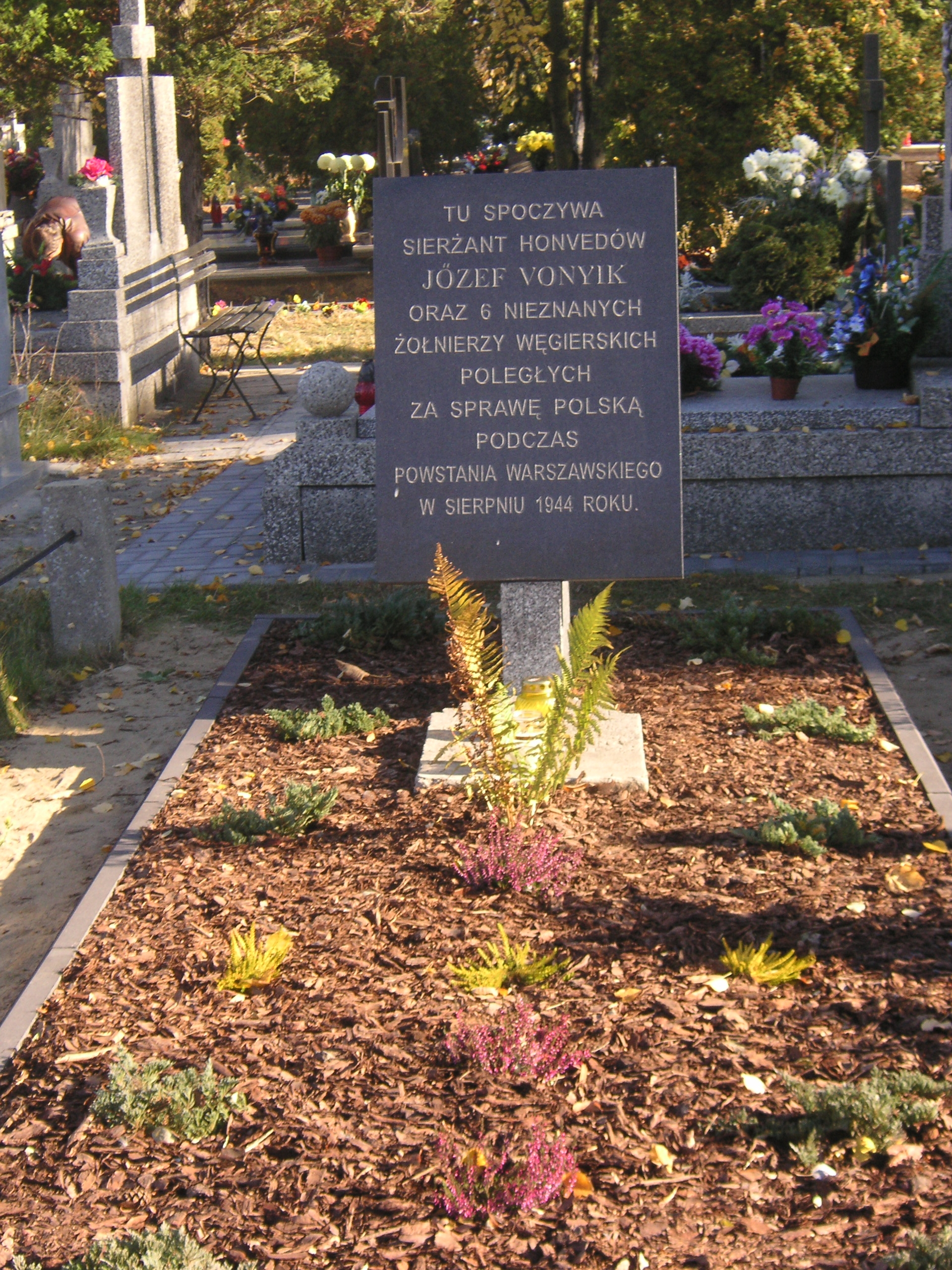
Grave of a Hungarian Honvéd captain and six of his men, who fell fighting on the Polish side in the 1944 Warsaw Uprising

In September 1939, Hitler asked Hungary to allow German forces to transit Hungarian territory in order to speed the German attack on eastern Poland; Hungary's Admiral Miklós Horthy declined permission, on the ground that it would be incompatible with Hungarian honor. On 17 September 1939, pursuant to the Molotov–Ribbentrop Pact and the Gestapo–NKVD conferences, the Soviet Union seized eastern and southeastern Poland and incorporated them into western Ukraine. Upon the Soviet invasion, Poland evacuated its government and substantial army and air units into allied Romania; considerable Polish military were simultaneously evacuated into Hungary, to the west of Romania. The evacuated Polish forces quickly, eluding or escaping internment, made their way west to France, there to regroup and continue the war alongside Poland's western allies. In June 1944, there were around 15,000 Polish refugees in Hungary.

During the 1944 Warsaw Uprising, many Hungarian soldiers, sympathetic to the Polish cause, gave munitions, medical supplies, and rations for the Polish Underground, and some even defected to join their Polish brothers. Hungarian soldiers assisted in the evacuation of civilian families during the Uprising.

During the Hungarian Revolution of 1956, Poles demonstrated their support for the Hungarian insurgents by donating blood. The blood banks had to work 24 hours a day because of how many people lined up to give blood for wounded Hungarians. By 3 November, 1,210 litres of blood and blood plasma had been delivered from Poland to Hungary, while by 12 November, 11,196 Poles had donated blood. The Polish Red Cross sent 44 tons of medical supplies to Hungary by air, and larger amounts were sent by road and rail.

In February 2021, Hungary returned to Poland the Renaissance armor of Polish King Sigismund II Augustus, which ended up in Hungary in the interwar period as a result of a misunderstanding, as it was believed to be the armor of King Louis II of Hungary. The gesture is perceived as another example of Polish-Hungarian friendship.

== Friendship Day ==
On 12 March 2007, Hungary's parliament declared 23 March as Hungarian-Polish Friendship Day. Four days later, the Polish parliament declared 23 March Polish-Hungarian Friendship Day by acclamation.

Friendship Day is celebrated regularly in both countries with concerts, festivals, and exhibitions. Some Polish music groups, such as SBB, feature Hungarian musicians (for example, Tamás Somló and Gábor Németh); Hungarian bands such as Locomotiv GT and Omega feature Polish musicians, including Józef Skrzek.

== Gallery ==
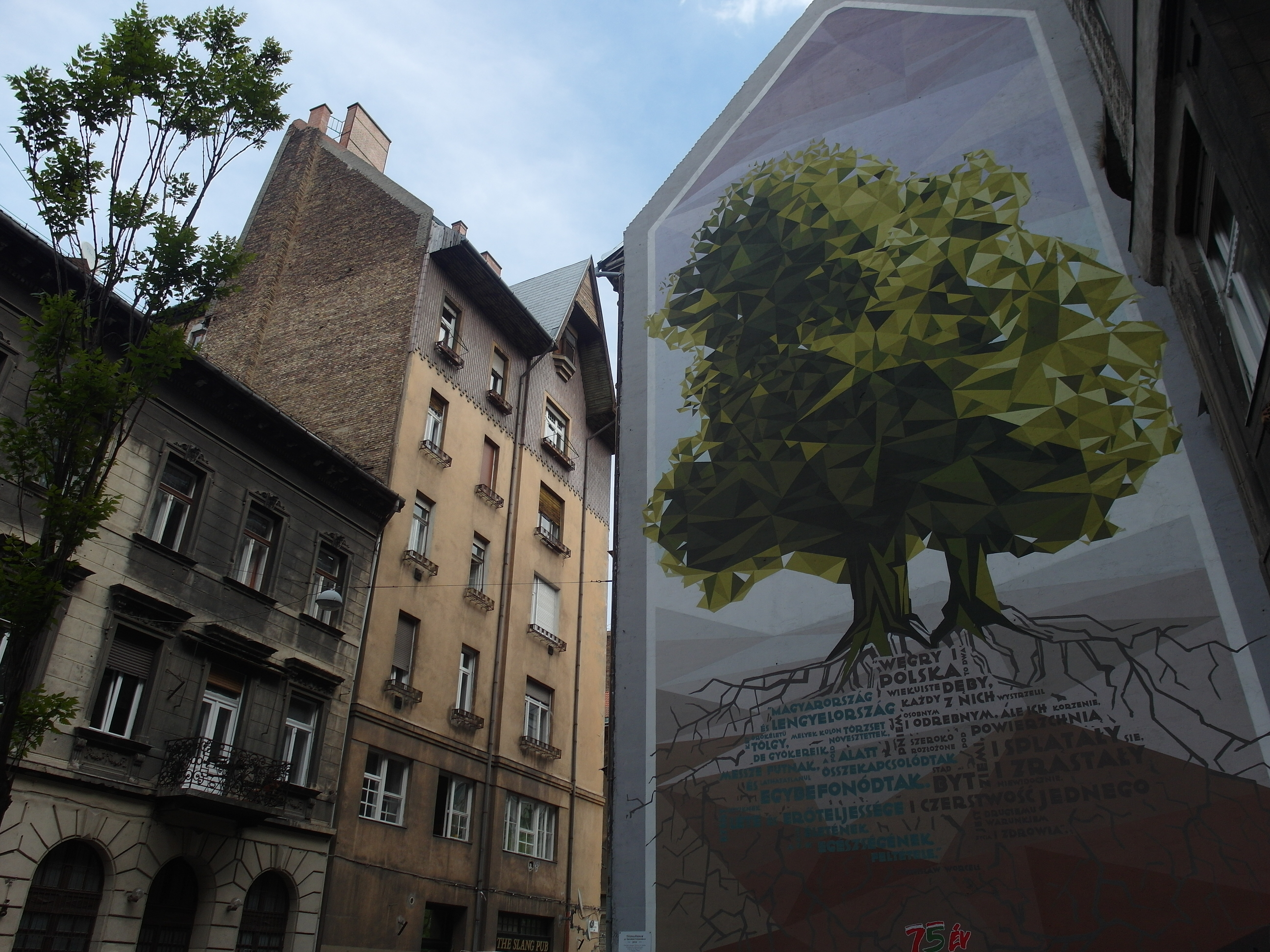
Two-oaks mural in Budapest, symbolizing Polish-Hungarian friendship

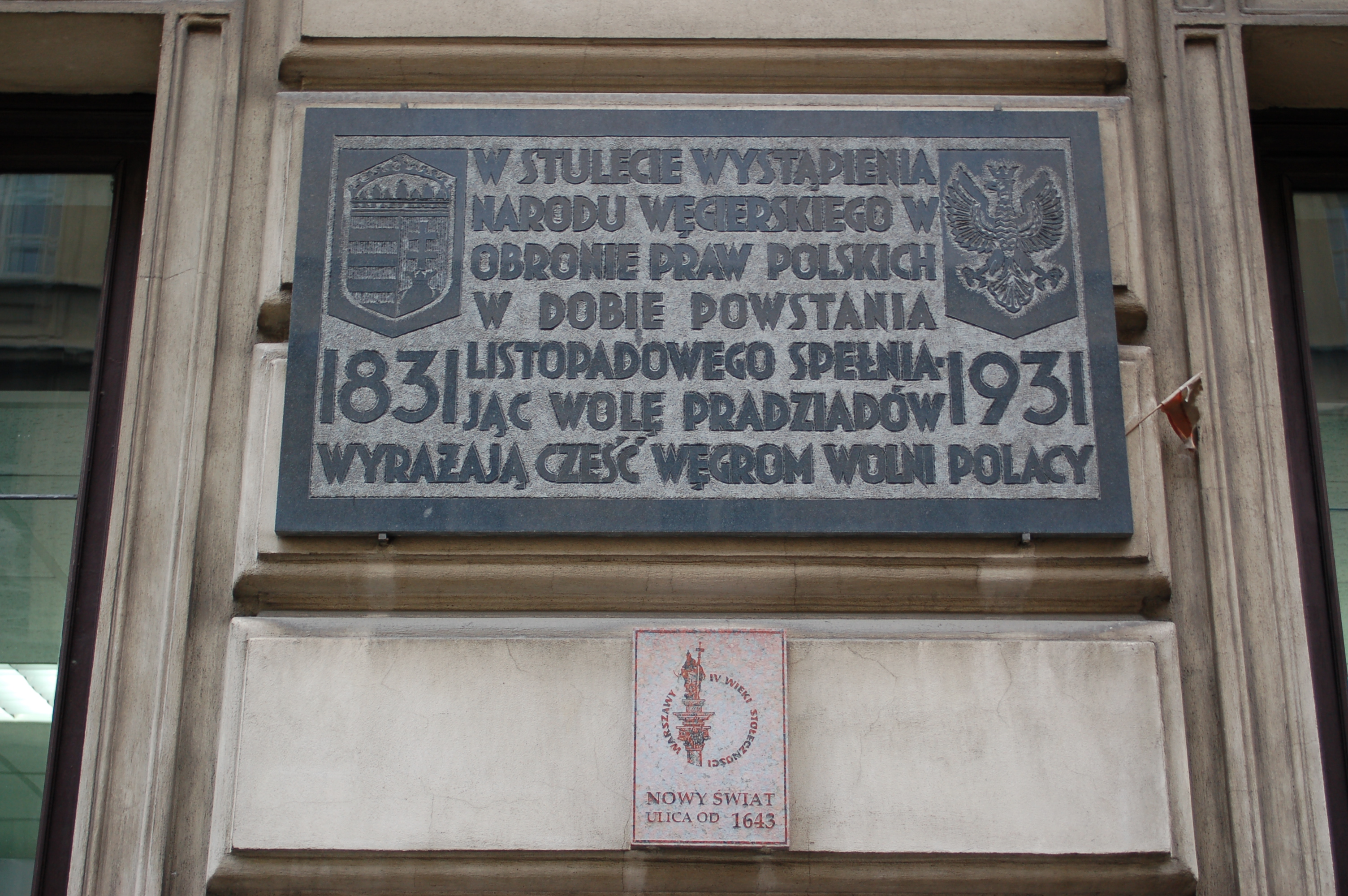
Warsaw plaque commemorating Hungarians' support for the Polish November 1830–31 Uprising

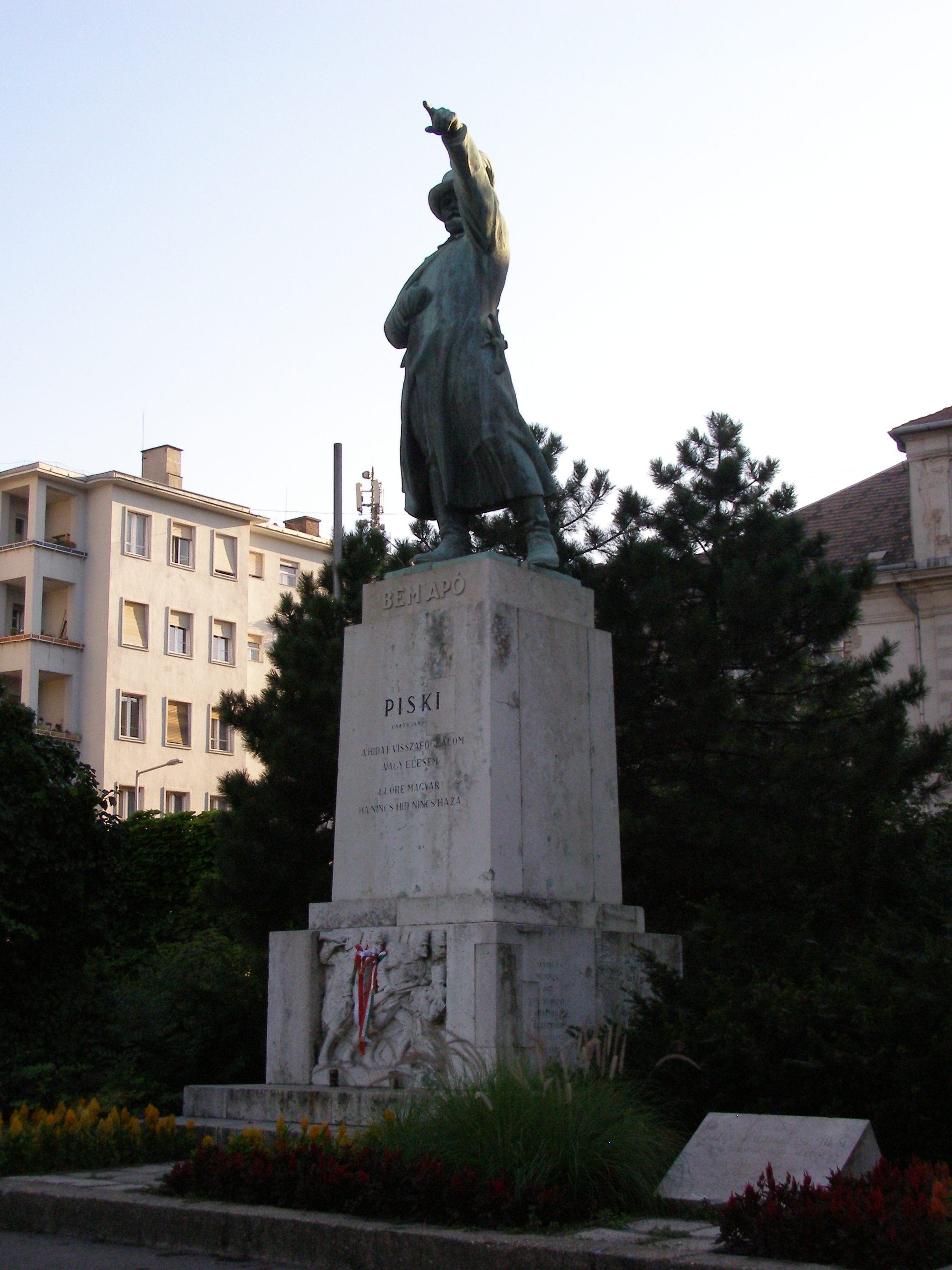
Monument to Józef Bem in Budapest

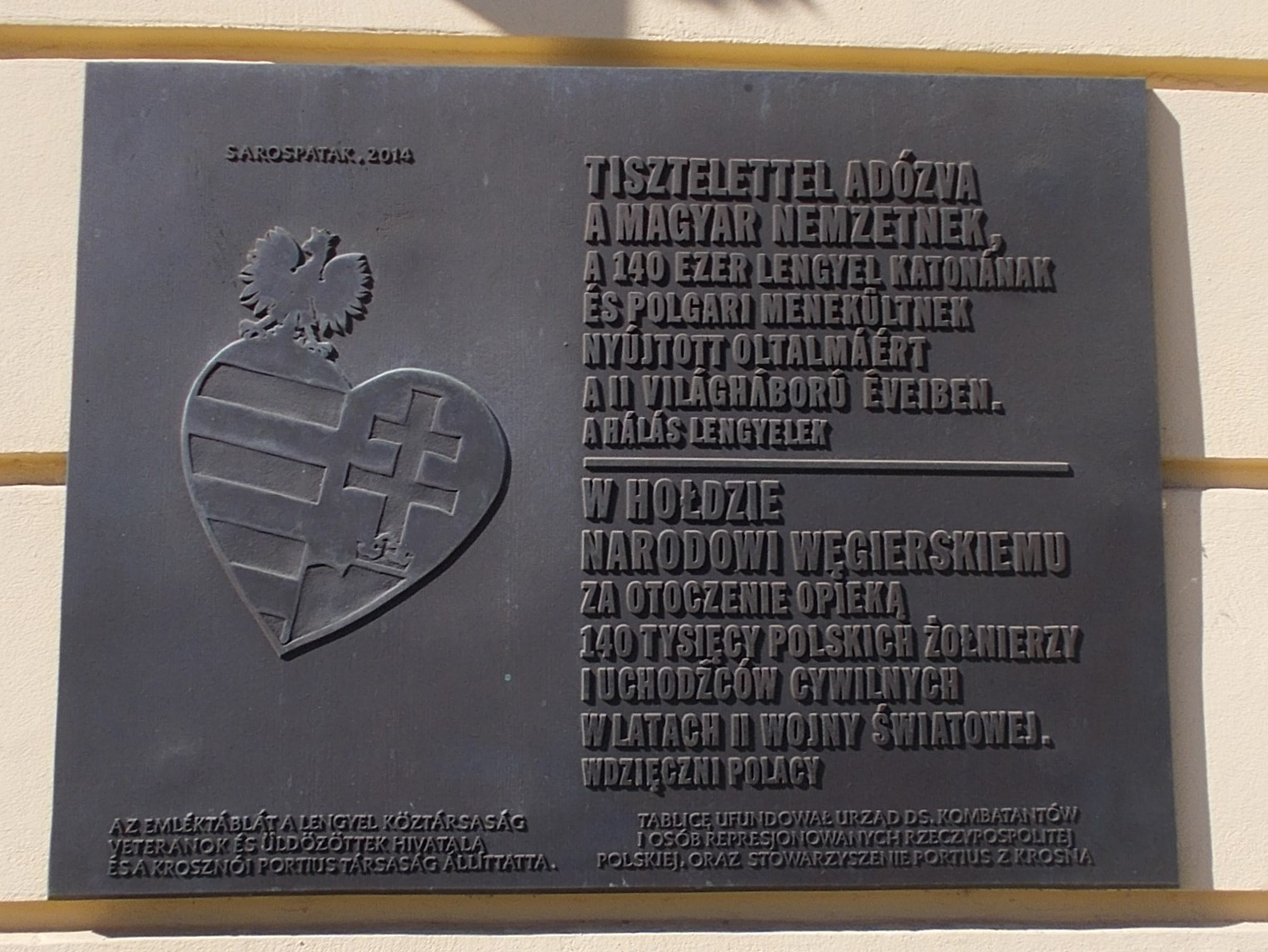
Plaque in Sárospatak commemorating Hungarians' help to 140,000 Polish soldiers and refugees in World War II

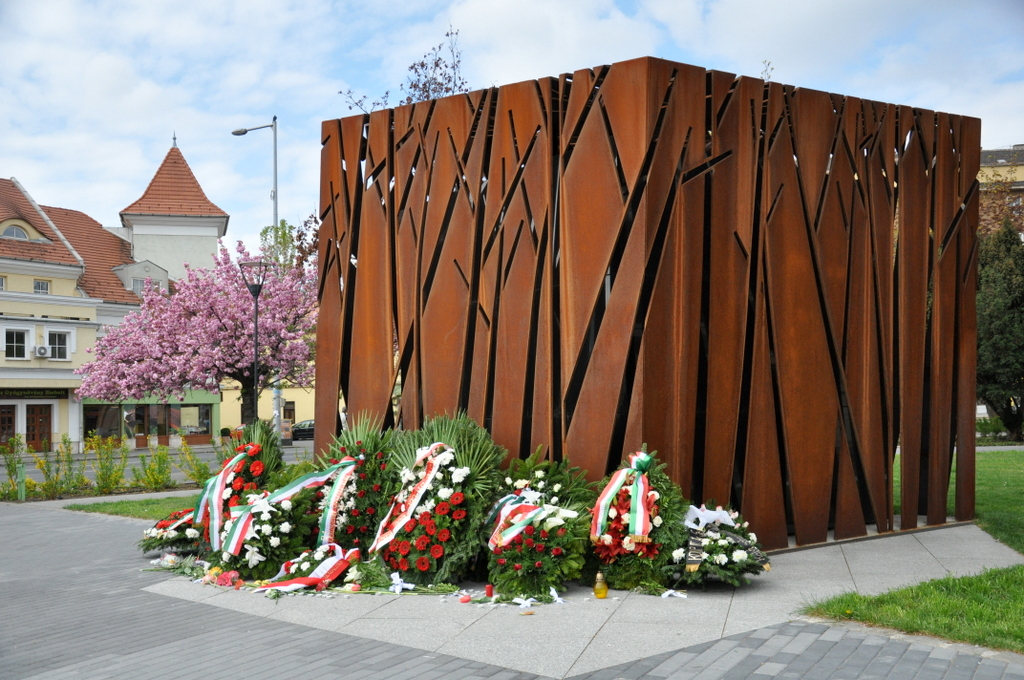
Memorial, in Budapest, to victims of the Katyń massacre

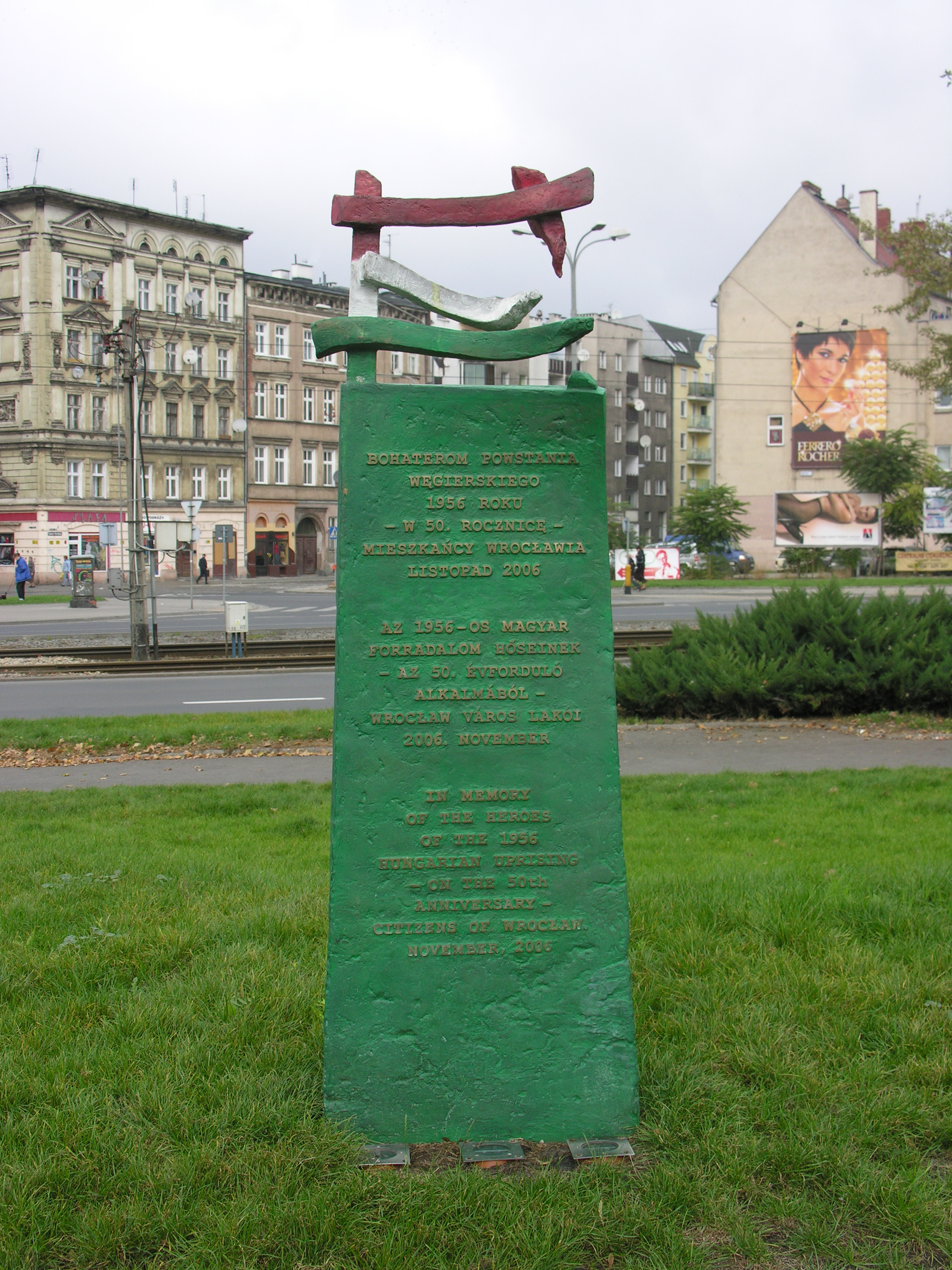
Memorial, in Wrocław, to heroes of the Hungarian Revolution of 1956

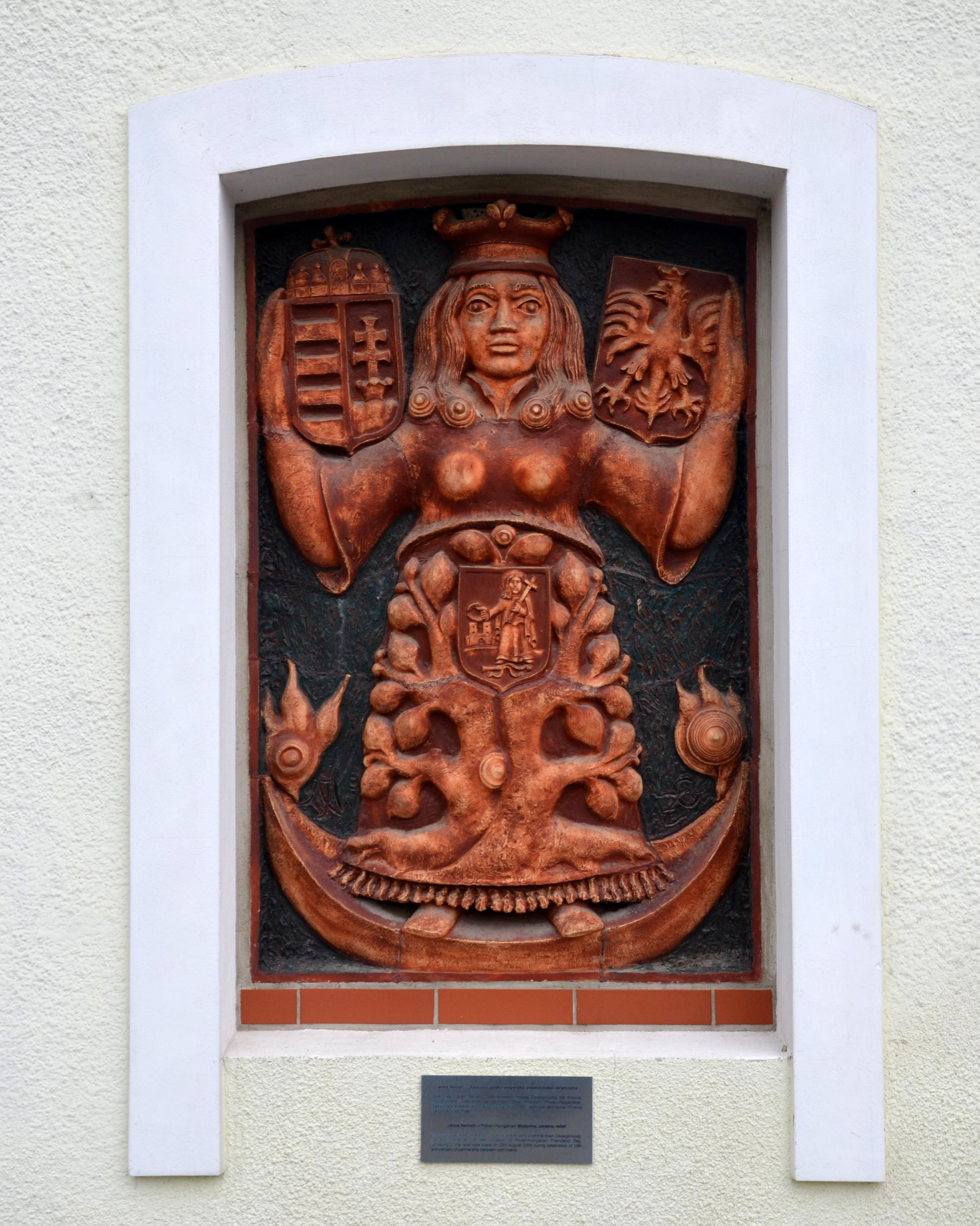
"Polish-Hungarian Madonna" by János Németh, a ceramic relief on wall in the market square in Krosno (2014).

== See also ==
- Mieszko II Lambert
- Leszek the White
- Maria Laskarina
- Coloman of Galicia
- Béla IV of Hungary
- Bolesław V the Chaste
- Kinga of Poland
- Yolanda of Poland
- Władysław I the Elbow-high
- Jadwiga of Kalisz
- Amadeus Aba
- Amadej coat of arms
- Matthew III Csák
- Záh (gens)
- Maria of Bytom
- Elizabeth of Poland, Queen of Hungary
- Matthias Corvinus
- György Dózsa
- Stephen Báthory
- Władysław III of Varna
- Józef Bem
- Michael Kovats and Casimir Pulaski
- Ignacy Łukasiewicz
- Poznań 1956 protests
- Hungarian Revolution of 1956
- Sylwester Zych
- Hungary–Poland relations
- Union of Hungary and Poland
- First Vienna Award
- Visegrád Group
- River(s) that connect(s) Poland to Hungary:
  - Cirocha, via Poloniny National Park
  - Laborec
  - Latoritsa
  - Bodrog
  - Tisza

== Sources ==
- Józef Kasparek, "Poland's 1938 Covert Operations in Ruthenia", East European Quarterly, vol. XXIII, no. 3 (September 1989), pp. 365–73.
- Józef Kasparek, Przepust karpacki: tajna akcja polskiego wywiadu (The Carpathian Bridge: a Covert Polish Intelligence Operation), Warszawa, Wydawnictwo Czasopism i Książek Technicznych SIGMA NOT, 1992, ISBN 83-85001-96-4.
- Edmund Charaszkiewicz, "Referat o działaniach dywersyjnych na Rusi Karpackiej" ("Report on Covert Operations in Carpathian Rus"), in Zbiór dokumentów ppłk. Edmunda Charaszkiewicza (Collection of Documents by Lt. Col. Edmund Charaszkiewicz), opracowanie, wstęp i przypisy (edited, with introduction and notes by) Andrzej Grzywacz, Marcin Kwiecień, Grzegorz Mazur, Kraków, Księgarnia Akademicka, 2000, ISBN 83-7188-449-4, pp. 106–30.
