= Sylwester Zych =

Sylwester Zych (May 19, 1950 – July 11, 1989) was a Polish Catholic priest.

== Biography ==
He was born in Ostrówek, and lived in Lipinki. Later he attended school in Duczki and Zielonka. Zych took part in various resistance activities, among them, serving as a secret courier for right wing political organisation KPN. As a part of many Communist-orchestrated political trials of this period, in 1982 he was charged with attempting to overthrow Polish political system. After being accused and sentenced for his alleged involvement in the Zdzisław Karos case, between 1982–1986, he was imprisoned by the Communist regime.

The body of Sylwester Zych was found at night on July 11, 1989, at a bus stop in Krynica Morska. The circumstances surrounding the deaths of three Polish priests (Sylwester Zych, Stefan Niedzielak, and Stanisław Suchowolec) were later investigated by a Senate commission composed of Zbigniew Romaszewski (chairman) and Alicja Grześkowiak (vice chairman). The investigation concluded that "there was criminal activity aimed at priests". The commission also suggested Polish secret police, the Służba Bezpieczeństwa, involvement in these crimes. Reverend Zych was laid to rest in Kobyłka.

He was posthumously decorated with a Gold Cross of Merit with Swords (by the last Polish President in exile-Ryszard Kaczorowski) and the Commander's Cross of the Order of Polonia Restituta (by the late President Lech Kaczyński)
