= Statue of Ignacy Skorupka =

Statue in Warsaw, Poland

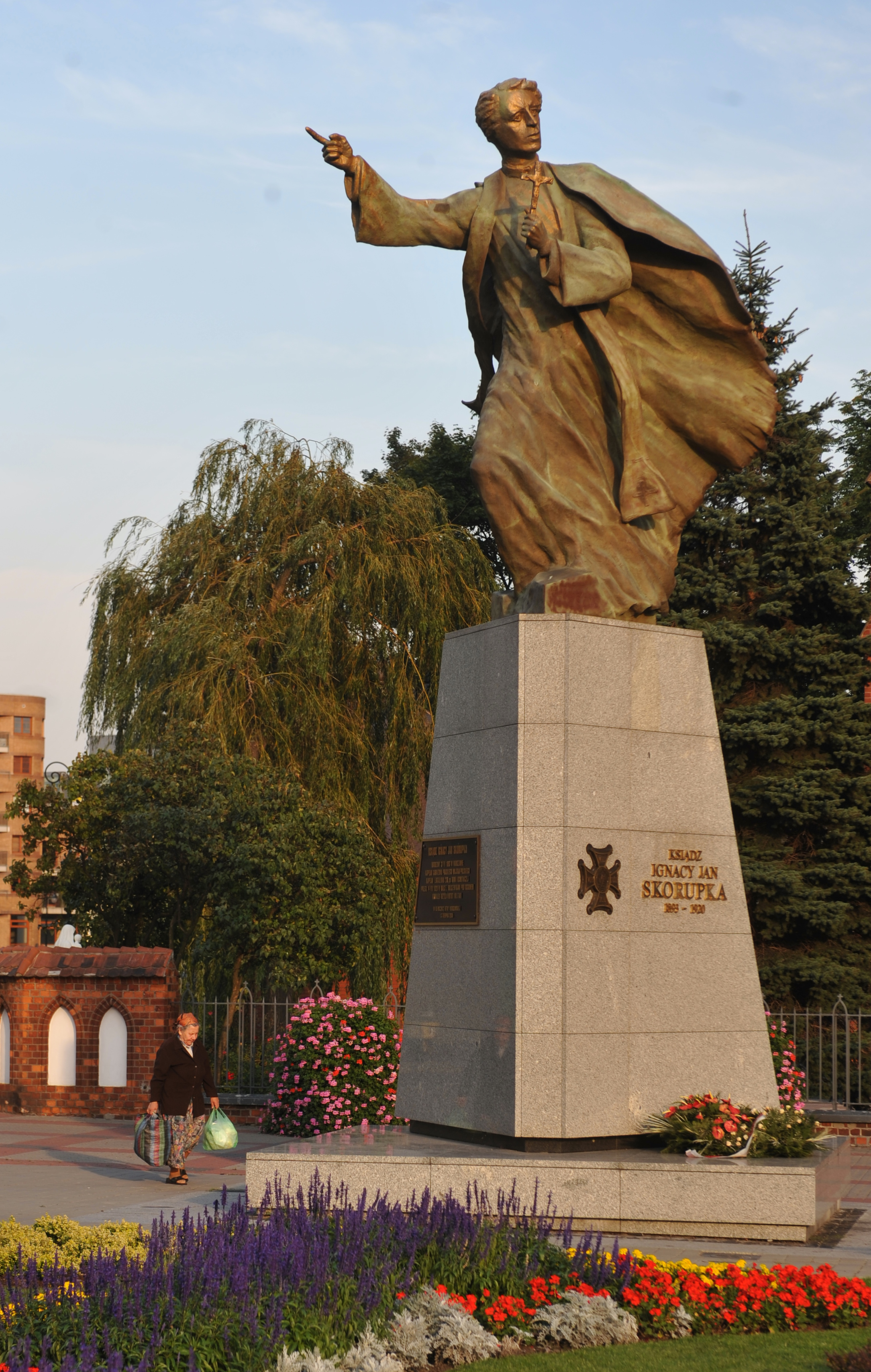
- The monument in 2008.
- Interactive map of Statue of Ignacy Skorupka
- Location: Veterans of 1863 Square, Praga-North, Warsaw, Poland
- Coordinates: 52.252125°N 21.030093°E
- Designer: Andrzej Renes
- Type: Statue
- Material: Gunmetal (statue); Granite (pedestal)
- Height: 9 m (total); 4 m (statue)
- Opening date: 29 September 2001
- Dedicated to: Ignacy Skorupka

The statue of Ignacy Skorupka (Polish pronunciation: [iɡˈna.t͡sɘ̟ skɔˈrup.ka]; Polish: Pomnik Ignacego Skorupki) is a monument in Warsaw, Poland, within the Praga-North district. It is placed at the Veterans of 1863 Square in front of the St. Florian Cathedral, within the neighbourhood of Old Praga. It is dedicated to Ignacy Skorupka, a 20th-century Roman Catholic priest, and a chaplain in the Polish Armed Forces, who died in the Battle of Warsaw in 1920. The monument consists of a 4-metre-tall gunmetal statue placed on a 5-metre-tall pedestal. It was designed by Andrzej Renes, and unveiled on 13 August 2005.

== History ==
The monument is dedicated to Ignacy Skorupka, a 20th-century Roman Catholic priest, and a chaplain in the Polish Armed Forces, who died in the Battle of Warsaw on 13 August 1920. The commemoration was proposed by Sławoj Leszek Głódź, the bishop of Warsaw-Praga, for the 85th anniversary of the battle and Skorupka's death. It was financed by the Diocese of Warsaw-Praga, and designed by sculptor Andrzej Renes. The sculpture was unveiled on 13 August 2005 in front of the St. Florian Cathedral, by the Praga division of Polish Scouting and Guiding Association. The ceremony was attanded by Lech Kaczyński, the mayor of Warsaw, Ryszard Kaczorowski, the last president of the Polish government-in-exile, and Józef Glemp, the primate of Poland.

Its design was poorly received by art critics and the public. Among others, they criticised the statue's unnatural posture, and unflattering facial expression. It was also deemed the worst sculpture in the city by numerous public surveys. It was also criticised by Głódź, who proposed its construction.

== Characteristics ==
The monument consists of a 4-metre-tall gunmetal statue, placed on a 5-metre-tall granite pedestal. It depicts Ignacy Skorupka, dressed in a priest attire, with his large robe being blown in the wind. He is leaning forward, pointing with his left hand to the east, and holding a Catholic cross in his right hand. The monument is facing in the direction of the offensive of Polish forces during the Battle of Warsaw. The pedestal features the following Polish inspiration:

Polish inscription

Ksiądz Ignacy Jan Skorupka urodzony 31 VII 1893 w Warszawie.
Kapelan Garnizonu Praskiego Wojska Polskiego.
Kapelan I Batalionu 236 pp. Armii Ochotniczej.
14 sierpnia 1920 poległ w walce z bolszewikami pod Ossowem.
Kawaler Krzyża Virtuti Militari.
Pochowany na Cmentarzu Wojskowym na Powązkach.
13 sierpnia 2005 w 85 rocznicę Bitwy Warszawskiej.

Translation:
English translation

Priest Ignacy Jan Skorupka born on 31 July 1893 in Warsaw.
The chaplain of the Praga Garrison of the Polish Armed Forces.
The chaplain of the 1st Battalion of the 236th Infantry Regiment of the Volunteer Army.
Fallen on 13 August 1920 in a fight against the Bolsheviks.
The Knight of the Cross of Virtuti Militari.
Buried at the Powązki Military Cemetery.
Unveiled on 13 August 2005, in the 85th anniversary of the Battle of Warsaw.
