= 36th Infantry Regiment (Poland) =

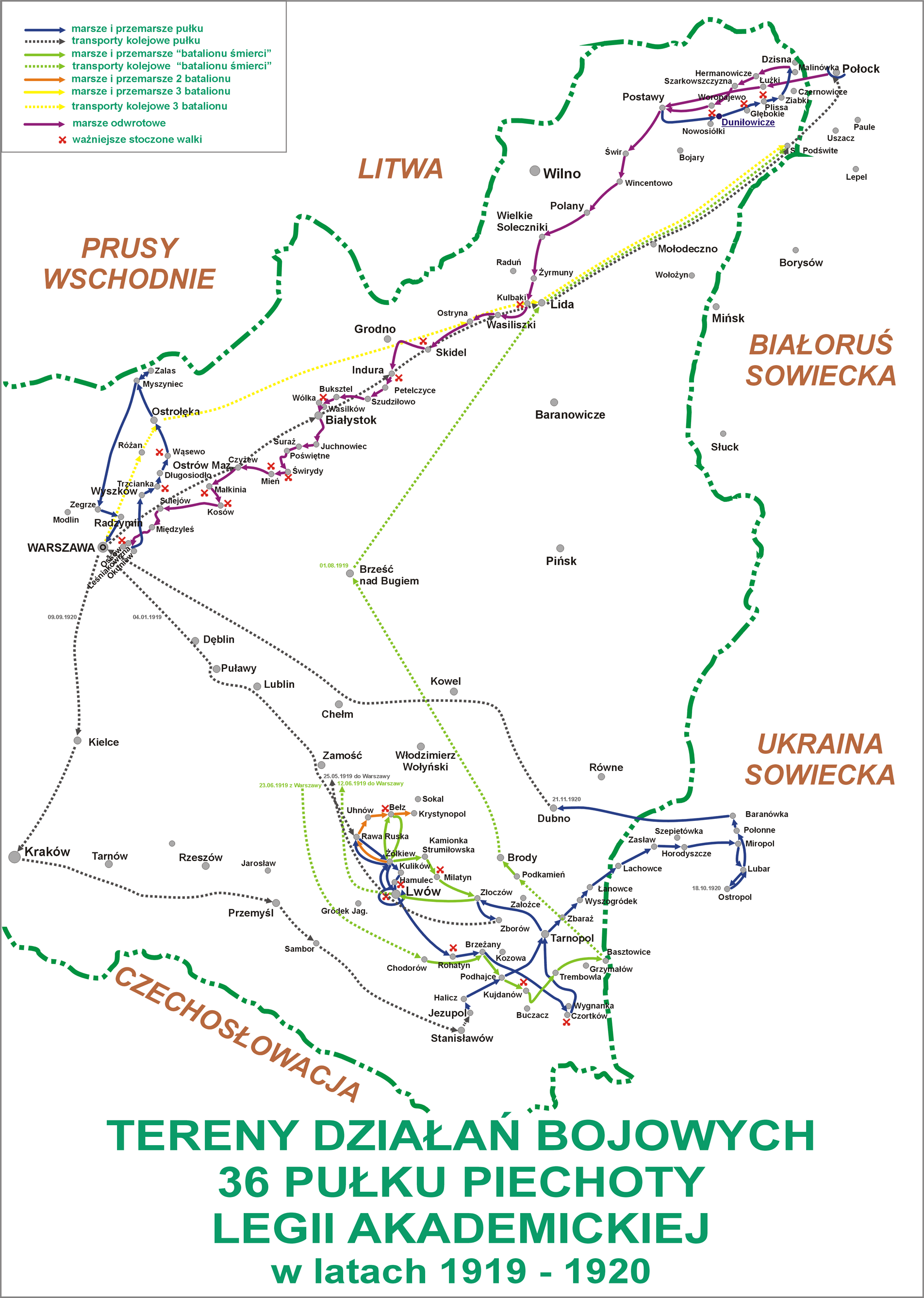
- Country: Poland

The 36th Infantry Regiment of the Academic Legion (Polish 36 pułk piechoty Legii Akademickiej, 36pp) was a Polish military unit. Initially made up of students from the University of Warsaw and the Warsaw University of Technology, it fought with distinction in the Polish-Bolshevik War, the Polish Defensive War and in the Warsaw Uprising.

The regiment was an all-volunteer force made up of students from Warsaw-based universities on November 11, 1918, that is the day Poland regained her independence. Initially the unit was simply named Infantry Regiment of the Academic Legion and took part in disarming the Austro-Hungarian and German soldiers remaining on Polish territory. Accepted formally into the Polish Army on December 3, it was renamed the 36th Infantry Regiment and on April 5, 1919, it was allowed to retain its former name as an honorary title.

== History ==
The regiment were sworn on December 13 and on January 4, 1919, it left Warsaw for Lwów, which was then under siege by the forces of the West Ukrainian People's Republic. Attached to the relief force under Gen. Jan Romer, it was initially made up of two battalions and a small NCO school. The regiment suffered heavy losses and both battalions were eventually merged. However, the unit managed to break through to the besieged city through Żółkiew, Kulików and Homulec. After that on September 7 the unit was reinforced with additional battalions formed in Warsaw and Modlin.

=== Polish-Bolshevik War ===
During the Polish-Bolshevik War, the unit was dispatched to the front on May 14, 1920, and took part in heavy fighting during the Polish retreat westwards. On June 3 it took part in the victorious battle of Duniłowicze. After the war this date became the Regiment's feast day. On August 13 and the following days, the regiment again took part in the Battle of Ossów (heavy fighting for the town of Osowiec and the village of Leśniakowizna during the battle of Warsaw). In a series of withdrawals and counter-attacks, and despite heavy losses, the regiment withstood the Bolshevik assault on Warsaw thus permitting Józef Piłsudski's main assault group to outflank and destroy the enemy. Among the fallen was the regiment's chaplain, Rev. Ignacy Skorupka and the commander of 2nd Battalion, Stanisław Matarewicz. During the fighting heavy losses were replaced with a battalion of an improvised 236th Infantry Regiment formed mostly of students and Scouts of the Warsaw borough of Praga. After the battle the regiment continued to pursue the retreating Russian forces in Ukraine and on September 24, 1920, took part in the liberation of an important railway hub in the town of Szepietówka.

During the interbellum, the regiment was attached to the Polish 28th Infantry Division and formed a part of the Warsaw garrison. It took part in the May Coup d'État of 1926 fighting in the ranks of the supporters of Piłsudski. On August 23, 1939, it was mobilized and attached to the Łódź Army.

In September 1939, commanded by Col. Karol Ziemski, the Regiment was dispatched to Greater Poland, where the regiment took part in the Polish retreat through Łask, Pabianice and Brwinów, and managed to reach the Modlin Fortress. The March Battalion of the 36th Regiment was left in Warsaw and served as a core of the Polish 336th Infantry Regiment that took part in the defence of Warsaw. Split onto two separate regiments, the 1st and 2nd Defenders of Praga Infantry Regiments under Stanislaw Milian and Stefan Kotowski, the unit held out until the final capitulation of Warsaw.

=== World War II ===
During the German occupation, veterans of the 36th Regiment were joined in the VI Home Army Area. During Operation Tempest the Regiment was recreated and took part in the Warsaw Uprising. The soldiers of the regiment fought in the failed uprising in Praga, but also in heavy fights for the boroughs of Żoliborz, Mokotów and Czerniaków. It was officially recreated by order of Tadeusz Bór-Komorowski out of three previously-existing partisan battalions. Led by Maj. Stanisław Błaszczak (nom de guerre Róg), it was composed of the Krybar (Cyprian Odorkiewicz), Dowgierd (Stanisław Taczanowski) and Żmudzin (Bolesław Kontrym) battalions, each named after their commanders' noms de guerre. After the capitulation of the Uprising, the soldiers shared the fate of the rest of the Armia Krajowa. The Regiment was not recreated after the war and its banner, founded in 1921 by the universities of Warsaw, is currently in the Museum of the Polish Army in Warsaw.

=== Post-WWII ===
In 1966, the regiment was awarded the Virtuti Militari, the highest Polish military decoration, by Władysław Anders and the Polish Government in exile. On December 12, 1992, the historical heritage of the 36th Regiment was accepted by modern Trzebiatów-based Polish 36th Mechanized Regiment, in 1994 reformed into the Polish 36th Mechanized Brigade. In 1991 the last president of Poland in exile, Ryszard Kaczorowski, returned the pre-war insignia to the newly elected Polish president Lech Wałęsa. Among them was the original Virtuti Militari awarded to the unit in 1966. Initially attached to the regimental banner in the Museum of the Polish Army, on June 3, 2000, it was given to the 36th Mechanized Brigade and attached to its modern banner. In 2008 brigade was disbanded and the traditions transferred to the 3rd Battalion, 7th Coastal Defense Brigade.

== Academic legion ==
Academic Legion (Poland) (Polish: Legia Akademicka) was a volunteer military formation, created on November 11, 1918, by students of different colleges in Warsaw, most of whom were members of secret Polish Military Organisation. On November 26, 1918, an infantry regiment, based on the volunteers was created. On December 3, it was named 36th Infantry Regiment, and fought with distinction in several conflicts in 1918–1921. The Academic Legion ceased to exist after the Polish-Soviet War. It was recreated in 1929, closed in 1932, and created again in 1937. Among its notable members were Karol Wojtyla and Jan Hermanowski.

The decision to form the Legion was accepted on November 6, 1918, during a meeting of students at the Warsaw University of Technology. With permission granted by authorities of Warsaw colleges, students began to join the organization. Soon afterwards, local branches of the Legion were formed in other main cities of the country: Lublin, Kraków, Poznań, Wilno and Lwów.

On November 11, 1918, the Academic Executive Committee (Akademicki Komitet Wykonawczy) was formed, together with the main office of the Legion, located in Warsaw, at 26 Ujazdowskie Alley. Starting on November 15, students-members of the Legion were placed at military barracks at Nowowiejska Street. Later, they were moved to the barracks at 11 Listopada Street, in the district of Praga. Members of the Legion guarded government offices as well as military buildings, together with arsenals of weaponry, abandoned by the Germans. On November 17, 1918, the Legion was regrouped and upon the initiative of Colonel Kazimierz Sawicki, two student battalions were attached to the 5th Legions Infantry Regiment. On November 26, Major Zygmunt Bobrowski was appointed commandant of a separate infantry regiment, which on December 3 was named 36th Infantry Regiment.

After the Polish-Soviet War, the Academic Legion ceased to exist. It returned in 1929, but in August 1932 it was again closed. Finally, on November 29, 1937, the anniversary of the outbreak of the November Uprising, the Academic Legion was officially recreated. At the same time, the Council of Ministers obliged all students to prepare for the military service.

In 1937–1939, the Academic Legion was under direct supervision of the Minister of Military Affairs. Its commandant was Colonel Tadeusz Roman Tomaszewski, and the activities of the organization concentrated on military exercises, carried out on army facilities. Also, lectures and physical exercises were introduced. Main purpose of the League was to spread military knowledge and raise the young generation of Poles in the spirit of Polish militarism.

The Academic Legion was dissolved by the government of the Polish People's Republic. It was officially recreated in Warsaw on May 22, 2000, by veterans of the 36th Infantry Regiment and activists of the Independent Students' Union. Other branches of the organization were then opened in Polish cities, such as Kraków and Szczecin.

== Bibliography ==
- Eugieniusz Walczak (1994). 36 Pułk Piechoty Legii Akademickiej. Warsaw, Ajaks. ISBN 83-85621-32-6.
