= Gmina Wołomin =

Gmina Wołomin Wołomin Commune
- Gmina
- Coat of arms

- Location within Poland
- Coordinates (Wołomin): 52°21′N 21°14′E
- Country: Poland
- Voivodeship: Masovian
- County: Wołomin
- Seat: Wołomin

Area
  - Total: 59.52 km^{2} (22.98 sq mi)

Population (2013)
  - Total: 51,671
  - Density: 868.1/km^{2} (2,248/sq mi)
  - Urban: 37,505
  - Rural: 14,166
- Website: www.wolomin.org

Gmina Wołomin is an urban-rural gmina (administrative district) in Wołomin County, Masovian Voivodeship, in east-central Poland. Its seat is the town of Wołomin, which lies approximately 22 kilometres (14 mi) north-east of Warsaw.

The gmina covers an area of 59.52 square kilometres (23.0 sq mi), and as of 2006 its total population is 49,509 (out of which the population of Wołomin amounts to 36,711, and the population of the rural part of the gmina is 12,798).

== Villages ==
Apart from the town of Wołomin, Gmina Wołomin contains the villages and settlements of Cięciwa, Czarna, Duczki, Helenów, Leśniakowizna, Lipinki, Majdan, Mostówka, Nowe Grabie, Nowe Lipiny, Ossów, Stare Grabie, Stare Lipiny, Stare Lipiny B, Turów and Zagościniec.

== Neighbouring gminas ==
Gmina Wołomin is bordered by the towns of Kobyłka and Zielonka, and by the gminas of Klembów, Poświętne and Radzymin.
