= Długa (river) =

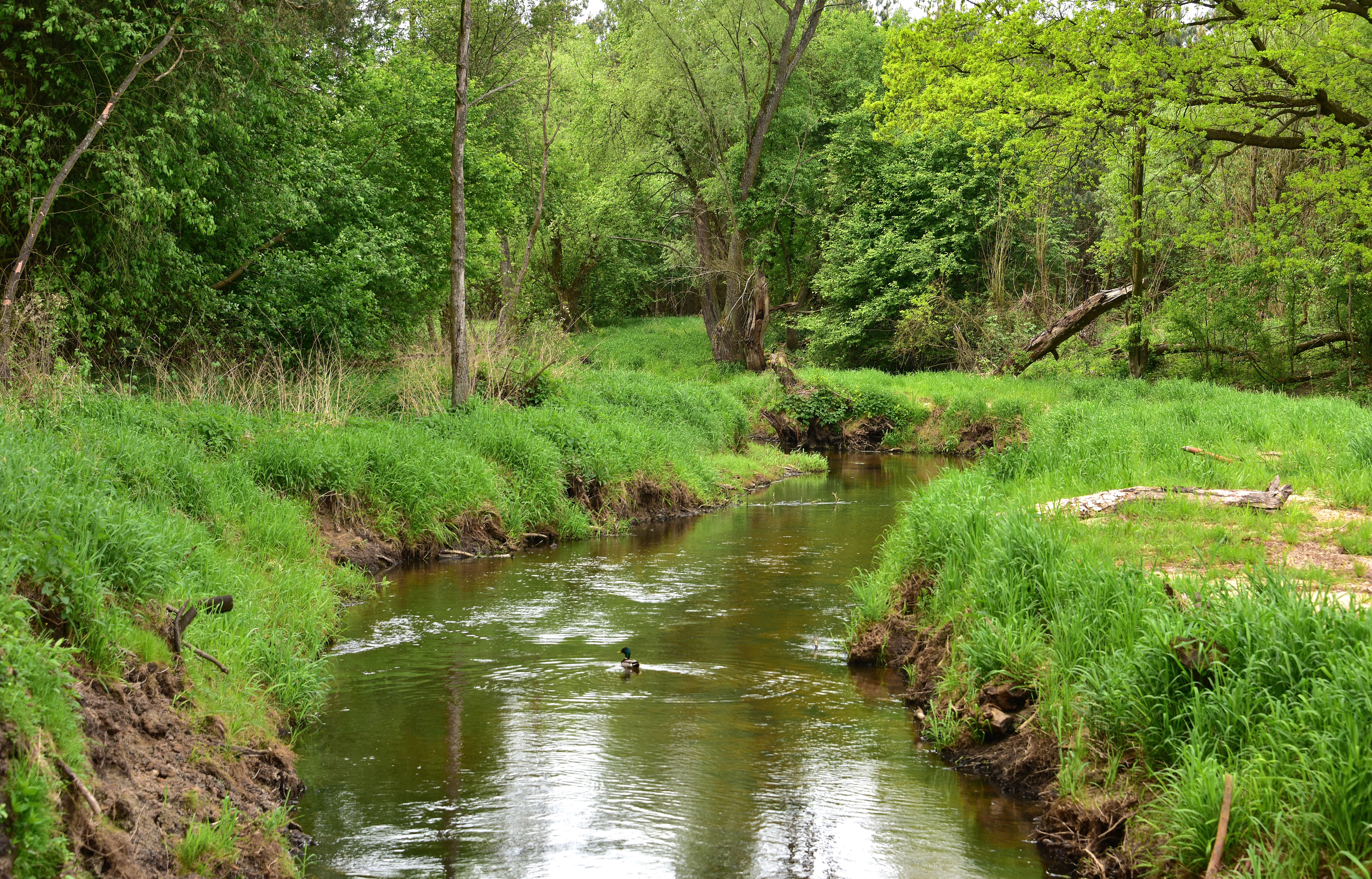
- Długa near Ossów

Location
- Country: Poland
- Voivodeship: Masovian

Physical characteristics
- Source
  - location: north of Mińsk Mazowiecki, Mińsk County
  - coordinates: 52°13′14.0″N 21°35′12.0″E
- Mouth: Kanał Żerański
  - location: Białołęka, Warsaw
  - coordinates: 52°21′23″N 21°02′02″E
  - elevation: 81 m (266 ft)
- Length: 47 km (29 mi)

Basin features
- Progression: Kanał Żerański → Narew→ Vistula→ Baltic Sea

Długa is a river of Poland, which flows into the Żerański Canal north of Warsaw.

In Polish, the name of the river can be literally translated as "long".
