= Mostówka, Wołomin County =

Mostówka
- Village
- Location within Poland
- Coordinates: 52°31′07″N 21°26′18″E
- Country: Poland
- Voivodeship: Masovian
- County: Wołomin
- Gmina: Wołomin
- Population: 129

Mostówka [mɔsˈtufka] is a village in the administrative district of Gmina Wołomin, within Wołomin County, Masovian Voivodeship, in east-central Poland.
