= Helenów, Gmina Wołomin =

Helenów
- Village
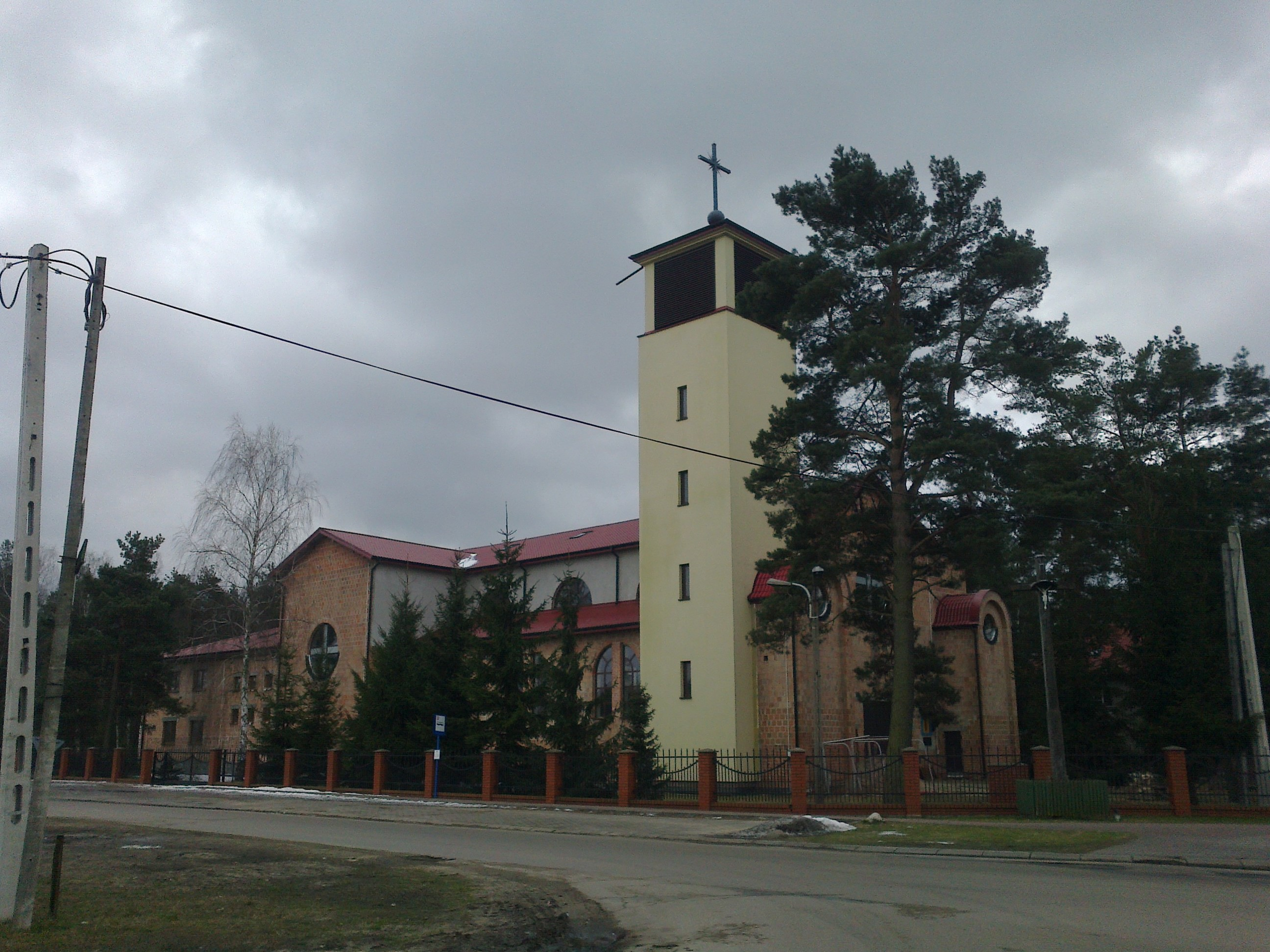
- Saint Faustyna Kowalska church in Helenów

- Location within Poland
- Coordinates: 52°22′42″N 21°13′52″E
- Country: Poland
- Voivodeship: Masovian
- County: Wołomin
- Gmina: Wołomin
- Time zone: UTC+1 (CET)
  - Summer (DST): UTC+2 (CEST)

Helenów [xɛˈlɛnuf] is a village in the administrative district of Gmina Wołomin, within Wołomin County, Masovian Voivodeship, in east-central Poland.

Five Polish citizens were murdered by Nazi Germany in the village during World War II.
