= BS Sure Shot Wołomin =

Basketball team

BS Sure Shot Wołomin is a Polish women's basketball team based in Wolomin that played in the Sharp Torell Basket Liga.

== History ==
In the 2003–04 season, BS Sure Shot Wołomin competed Sharp Torell Basket Liga, but at the end of the 2004–05, it dropped from STBL and will play in the 1st League next season.

== Team history ==
The team has played many top-level games in Poland.
