= Czarna, Wołomin County =

Czarna
- Village
- Location within Poland
- Coordinates: 52°22′09″N 21°13′32″E
- Country: Poland
- Voivodeship: Masovian
- County: Wołomin
- Gmina: Wołomin

Czarna [ˈt͡ʂarna] is a village in the administrative district of Gmina Wołomin, within Wołomin County, Masovian Voivodeship, in east-central Poland.
