= Majdan, Wołomin County =

Majdan
- Village
- Location within Poland
- Coordinates: 52°20′N 21°18′E
- Country: Poland
- Voivodeship: Masovian
- County: Wołomin
- Gmina: Wołomin

Majdan (Polish pronunciation: [ˈmajdan]) is a village in the administrative district of Gmina Wołomin, within Wołomin County, Masovian Voivodeship, in east-central Poland.
