= Turów, Masovian Voivodeship =

Turów
- Village
- Location within Poland
- Coordinates: 52°19′N 21°12′E
- Country: Poland
- Voivodeship: Masovian
- County: Wołomin
- Gmina: Wołomin

Turów [ˈturuf] is a village in the administrative district of Gmina Wołomin, within Wołomin County, Masovian Voivodeship, in east-central Poland.
