= Cięciwa, Wołomin County =

Cięciwa
- Village
- Location within Poland
- Coordinates: 52°19′N 21°17′E
- Country: Poland
- Voivodeship: Masovian
- County: Wołomin
- Gmina: Wołomin
- Population: 151

Cięciwa [t͡ɕɛnˈt͡ɕiva] is a village in the administrative district of Gmina Wołomin, within Wołomin County, Masovian Voivodeship, in east-central Poland.
