= Stare Lipiny =

- Village
- Location within Poland
- Coordinates: 52°20′29″N 21°16′02″E
- Country: Poland
- Voivodeship: Masovian
- County: Wołomin
- Gmina: Wołomin

Stare Lipiny [ˈstarɛ liˈpinɨ] is a village in the administrative district of Gmina Wołomin, within Wołomin County, Masovian Voivodeship, in east-central Poland.
