= Duczki =

- Village
- Location within Poland
- Coordinates: 52°22′N 21°17′E
- Country: Poland
- Voivodeship: Masovian
- County: Wołomin
- Gmina: Wołomin
- Population (approx.): 2,500

Duczki [ˈdut͡ʂki] is a village in the administrative district of Gmina Wołomin, within Wołomin County, Masovian Voivodeship, in east-central Poland. It's situated approximately 4 km (2 mi) north-east of Wołomin and 26 km (16 mi) north-east of Warsaw.
