= Stare Lipiny B =

- Village
- Location within Poland
- Coordinates: 52°20′45″N 21°16′6″E
- Country: Poland
- Voivodeship: Masovian
- County: Wołomin
- Gmina: Wołomin
- Population: 510

Stare Lipiny B is a village in the administrative district of Gmina Wołomin, within Wołomin County, Masovian Voivodeship, in east-central Poland.
