= Stare Grabie =

- Village
- Location within Poland
- Coordinates: 52°22′18″N 21°19′02″E
- Country: Poland
- Voivodeship: Masovian
- County: Wołomin
- Gmina: Wołomin

Stare Grabie [ˈstarɛ ˈɡrabjɛ] is a village in the administrative district of Gmina Wołomin, within Wołomin County, Masovian Voivodeship, in east-central Poland.
