= Nowe Lipiny =

- Village
- Location within Poland
- Coordinates: 52°21′27″N 21°16′22″E
- Country: Poland
- Voivodeship: Masovian
- County: Wołomin
- Gmina: Wołomin
- Population: 1,200

Nowe Lipiny [ˈnɔvɛ liˈpinɨ] is a village in the administrative district of Gmina Wołomin, within Wołomin County, Masovian Voivodeship, in east-central Poland.
