= Ignacy Skorupka =

Polish chaplain (1893–1920)

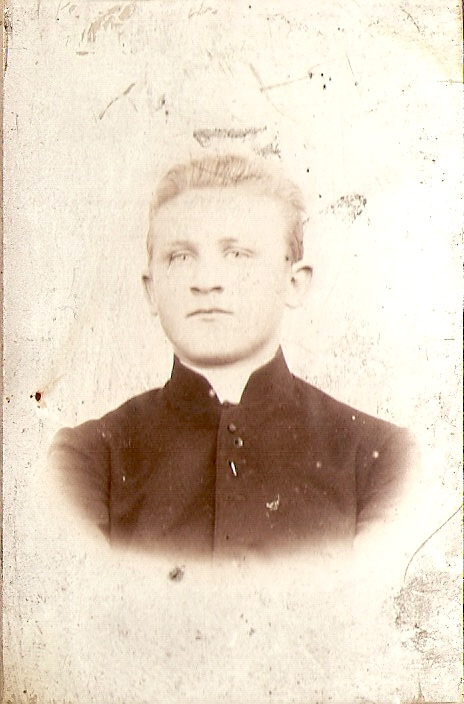

Personal life
- Born: Ignacy Jan Skorupka; July 31, 1893 Warsaw, Vistula Land
- Died: August 14, 1920 (aged 27) Ossów, Second Polish Republic

Religious life
- Religion: Roman Catholicism
- Ordination: January 26, 1916

Ignacy Skorupka (31 July 1893 – 14 August 1920) was a Polish priest, chaplain of the Polish Army. He died during the battle of Warsaw. He became one of the most famous casualties of the battle.

== Biography ==
Ignacy Jan Skorupka was born on 31 July 1893 in Warsaw. He studied at the seminary in St. Petersburg. In 1916 he took his Holy Orders, and in 1918 he was briefly a parish priest in the Russian Empire. In the chaotic times of the first stages of the Polish–Soviet War in 1918, he became one of the Polish regional leaders in the Kresy borderlands. Since the fall of 1918 he practiced his religious profession in Łódź, and from the fall of 1919, in the Polish capital of Warsaw. He gave several sermons in the St. John's Archcathedral.

In early July 1920 he volunteered as a military chaplain of the Polish Army, and was attached to the 236 Infantry Regiment of the Volunteer Army (later, part of the 36th Infantry Regiment). On the evening of 14 August he was killed at the battle of Ossów during Polish counter-attack, part of the larger battle of Warsaw. Two different accounts of his death have surfaced. One suggests he was in the midst of Anointing of the Sick for a fatally wounded soldier when he, a noncombatant, was hit by an accidental bullet. Another, popularized by a Polish military dispatch from 16 August stated that chaplain Skorupka died while encouraging soldiers to advance, leading a charge in the front lines, with a crucifix in his hands.

== Remembrance ==
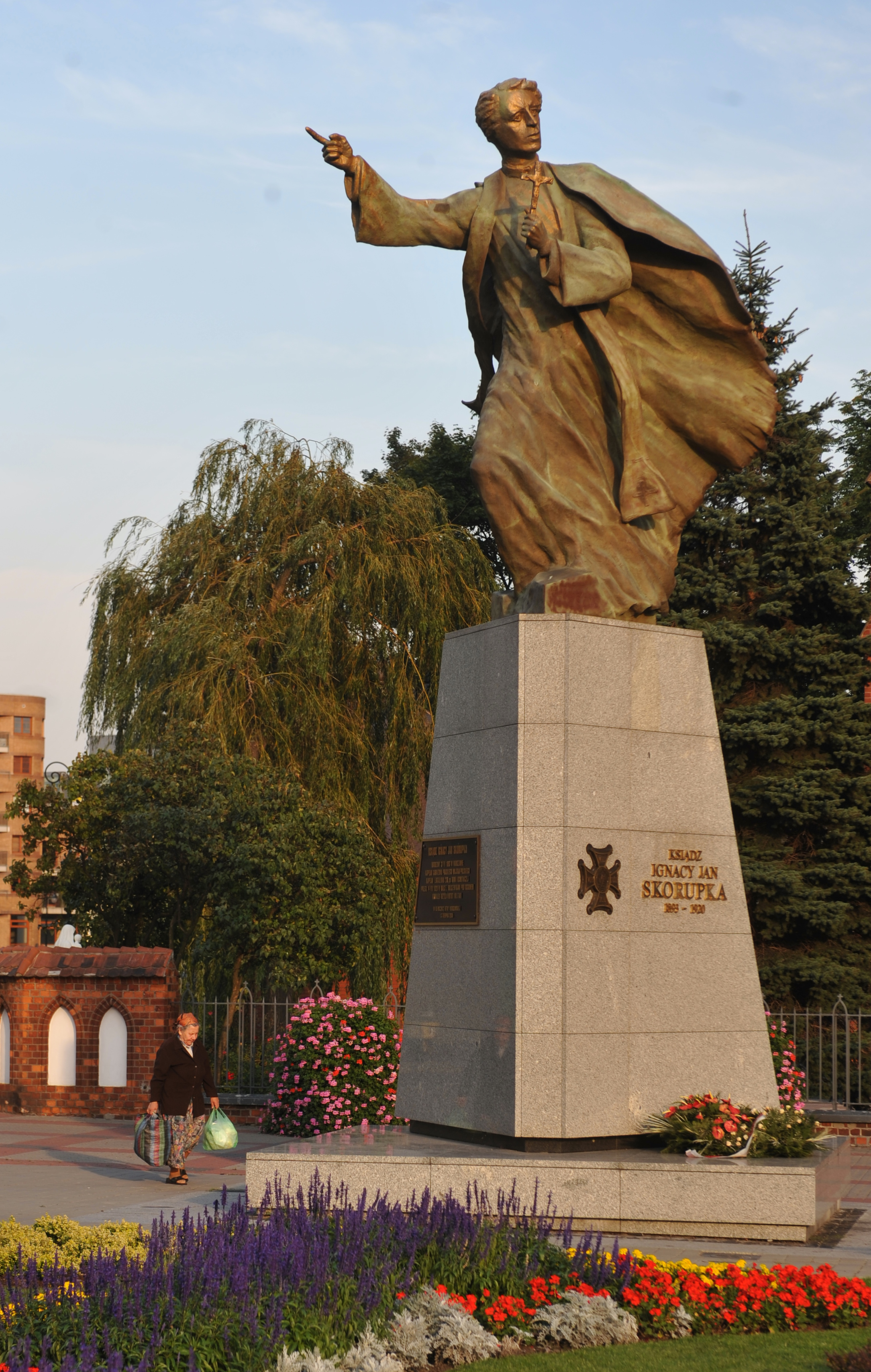
Monument to Skorupka in Warsaw

A day later his body was transported to a garrison church in Warsaw, and shortly, he was given a state funeral at the prestigious Powązki Cemetery, attended by many government and military authorities; general Józef Haller presented him with a posthumous Silver Cross of the Virtuti Militari. His death became a political ploy, used by the opponents of Polish military commander and leader Józef Piłsudski, architect of the Polish strategy that led to the victory at Warsaw. His opponents labelled the battle "miracle of Vistula", and attributed the Polish victory to a number of causes, up to and including divine intervention, and Skorupka's martyr-like death became part of their attempt to minimize Piłsudski's fame. Several monuments, streets and other landmarks were dedicated to him in the Second Polish Republic; he became a central figure in several books, poems and dramas; and Pope Pius XI commissioned a wall painting of him by Jan Henryk de Rosen at the battle at the Castel Gandolfo. Another popular painting of him was created by Jerzy Kossak.

A documentary about him, Zwyczajny bohater, was released in 2005. In 2010 he was posthumously awarded the Order of the White Eagle.
