= Wołomin =

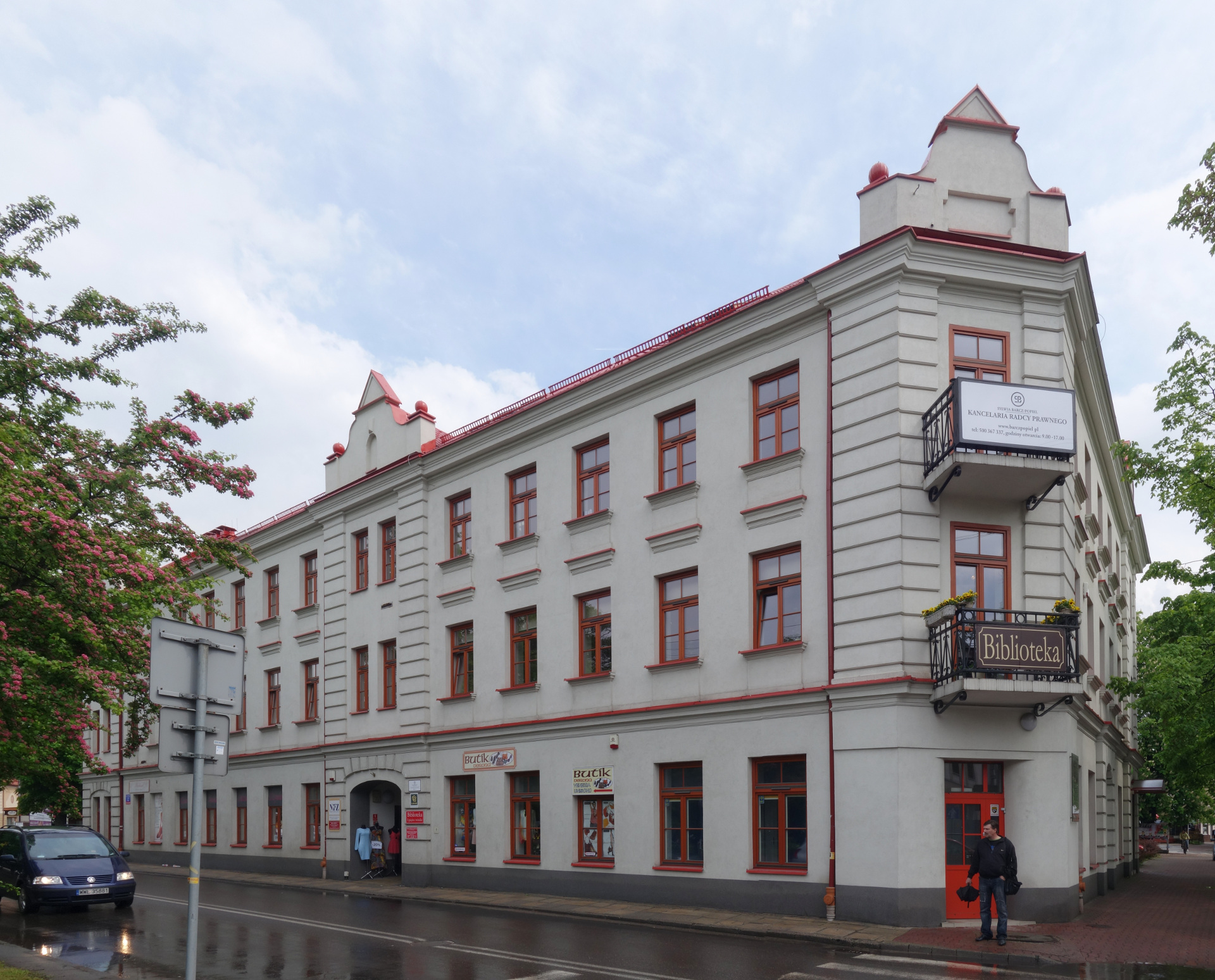
- Municipal Public Library Zofia and Wacław Nałkowski Museum Church of Our Lady of Częstochowa Laurentium Villa Old Power Plant

- Coat of arms

- Location within Poland
- Coordinates: 52°21′N 21°14′E
- Country: Poland
- Voivodeship: Masovian
- County: Wołomin
- Gmina: Wołomin
- Established: 15th century
- Town rights: 1919

Government
  - Mayor: Elżbieta Radwan (PO)

Area
  - Total: 17.32 km^{2} (6.69 sq mi)

Population (2006)
  - Total: 36,711
  - Density: 2,120/km^{2} (5,490/sq mi)
- Time zone: UTC+1 (CET)
  - Summer (DST): UTC+2 (CEST)
- Postal code: 05-200
- Area code: +48 022
- Car plates: WWL
- Website: http://www.wolomin.org

Wołomin [vɔˈwɔmin] is a town in the Warsaw metropolitan area in the Masovian Voivodship, seat of Wołomin County. Wołomin is situated approximately 20 km (12 mi) east of Warsaw, the capital of Poland, near the railway to Białystok. It has approximately 43,000 inhabitants and covers an area of 14 km^{2} (5 sq mi).

In the 1990s, the town was synonymous with the "Wołomin gang", one of two major organised crime groups in the country.

== History ==
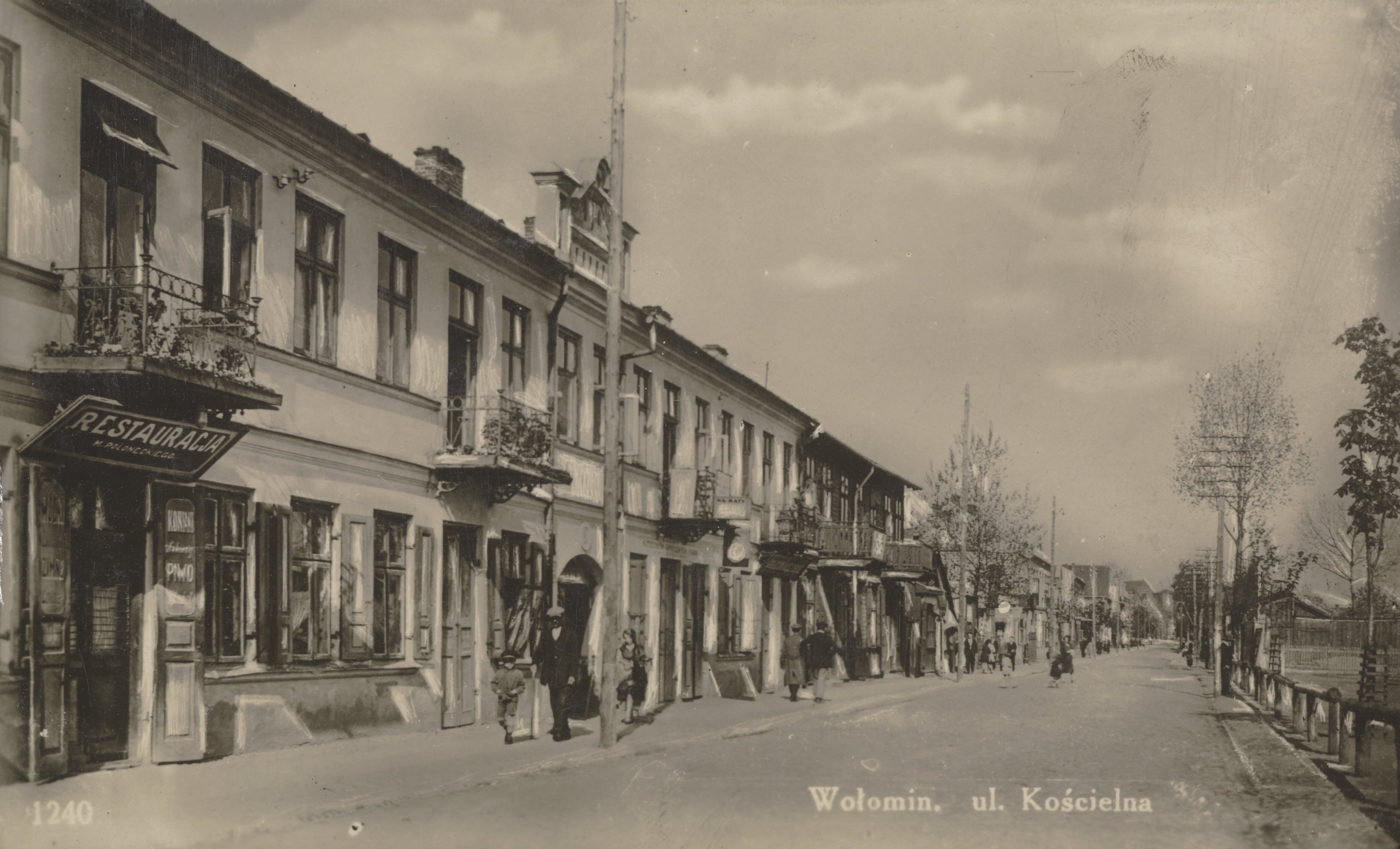
Kościelna Street before 1939

Wołomin was first mentioned in chronicles from the 15th century. It remained a small village in central Masovia without much significance. Since the 19th century, and especially after the foundation of the railway in 1862, Wołomin became a summer holiday destination for Warsaw citizens. The Wołomin glassworks were founded in the beginning of the 20th century.

Wołomin was declared a town in 1919 after the return of Poland's sovereignty. In 1920 the Polish counter-attack in the Battle of Warsaw was conducted near Wołomin. According to the 1921 census, it had a population of 6,248, 63.4% Polish, 27.2% Jewish, 7.6% Russian, 1.2% Ukrainian, 0.14% English and 0.14% Czech by declared nationality. Polish writer Zofia Nałkowska had a house in Wołomin, which became an inspiration for her 1925 book House over meadows (Polish: Dom nad łąkami).

=== World War II ===
At the beginning of World War II, Wołomin was bombed by the German Air Force. In Wołomin there were no big fights on land, but there were regular air fights between German and Polish planes from the airport in Zielonka. 157 soldiers from Wołomin participated in the war against the Germans. A large proportion were killed, the rest of them were taken prisoner. German forces occupied Wołomin on September 14, 1939. A number of activists of pre-war Polish social organizations were sent to concentration camps by Germans.

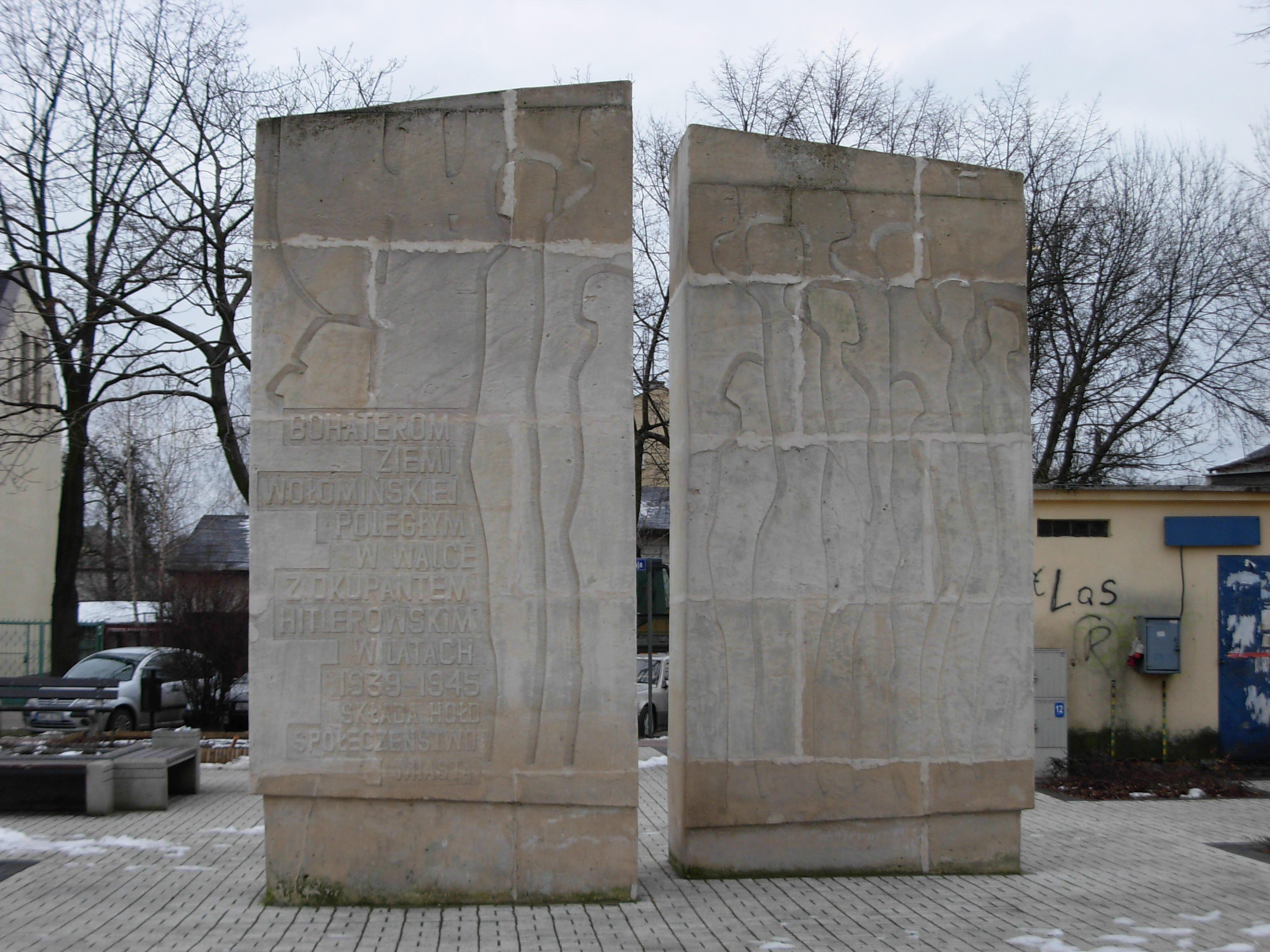
Memorial to Poles fallen in fight against German occupiers during World War II

A resistance movement was created in Wołomin based on scouts and national organizations. Eventually, the Wołomin conspiracy was subordinated to the Narodowe Siły Zbrojne organization.

During World War II, the Jews of Wołomin were forced into a ghetto set up by Nazi German administration on 15 November 1940, along the railway line between the streets of Kobyłka, Wspólna, Wiejska, Glinka and Cementowa. The ghetto inmates numbered about 2,700 people including Jews expelled from other locations. The Judenrat was established in the building at 17 Nałkowskiego Street. Deportations aboard Holocaust trains to Treblinka extermination camp began on 19 August 1942. The ghetto was liquidated on 6 October 1942. A few hundred people (416-620 according to different sources) were shot in the ghetto, including many elderly and sick people. Their bodies were buried in a mass grave near the J. Korsaka Road. Some Jews were deported to the Warsaw Ghetto as slave labour and exterminated during the Grossaktion Warsaw.

In 1944 a substantial battle was fought near the town between the Soviet armoured units and German 39th Panzer Corps. Soviet losses were high and the Red Army was forced to retreat. Most of the Russian minority escaped westwards before the arrival of the Red Army.

=== Postwar history ===
After the war, Wołomin became a capital of the powiat of Wołomin and started to grow rapidly. The window assembly plant was founded and Wołomin soon became a suburb of Warsaw. Even today most of the town's inhabitants commute to Warsaw on a daily basis.

After 1989 Wołomin's glassworks were temporarily closed during the recession. However, the technology of production of temperature resistant glass, invented in the facility, allowed the factory to continue production and recover under new ownership.

== Sports ==
- BS Sure Shot Wołomin - women's basketball team, playing in the 2003/2004 season, in Basket Liga Kobiet
- Sports and Recreation Center (OSiR) "Huragan"
- Huragan Wołomin - football club founded in 1923. Since the 2013/2014 season plays in the III Łódzko-Mazowiecka league
- B.S SALWA - shooting club, www.salwa.pl

== Crime ==
The most well known of the Polish organised crime groups in the 1990s was the so-called "Wołomin gang" and their arch-nemesis' the "Pruszków gang",^{[quote]} with whom they fought bloody turf wars. Eventually the groups were finally crushed by the Polish police in cooperation with the German police in a spectacular raid on the A2 motorway between Konin and Poznań in September 2011.

== International relations ==
=== Twin towns — Sister cities ===
Wołomin is twinned with:

- Salerno, Italy
