= Amadej coat of arms =

Polish coat of arms

Amadej
- Battle cry: Hamadej, Sokoła
- Alternative name(s): Amadejowa, Amadey, Almeyda, Amende, Amenda, Almejda, Amadeja, Amedja, Amadij, Hamadaj, Hamadej, Hamadejowa, Homadziej, Orlek
- Earliest mention: ca 1300 (record)
- Families: 36 names Amadej, Grad, Gronostaj, Msurowski, Mzurowski, Suskrajowski, Walewski, Żyzmowski, Kozanecki Amadej, Bobolicki, By(s)trzanowski, Grad, Gronostaj, Jankowski, Kosiński, Kozanecki, Kozubski, Łagiewnicki, Maierhoffer, Msurowski, Mszaniecki, Mzurowski, Mszurowski (Mschurowski), Muszurowski, Szurowski, Pruszkowski, Ptak, Suskrajewski, Suskrajowski, Suskrojowski, Walewski, Węgrzynowicz, Włostowski, Żyzmowski.

Amadej is a Polish coat of arms of either Hungarian origin or West Prussian. It was used by several szlachta families in the times of the Kingdom of Poland and the Polish–Lithuanian Commonwealth.

== History ==
The family is either of Hungarian origin or West Prussian origin.

Earliest mentions of the family and coat of arms appeared circa 1300 AD, when the king Władysław I Łokietek sought help to return to the throne. According to contemporaries, Amadej were the first to help. With this new found wealth, the king took over a castle in Wiślica. He rewarded the family with wealth and honors.

== Blazon ==
Gules an eagle displayed recursant argent armed and crowned or holding in its beak an annulet also or. Crest: issuant out of a crest coronet or five ostrich feathers argent. Mantled gules doubled argent.

It is exceptional that it is a mirror of the coat of arms of Poland as it has a dexter eagle which appears in the national coat as a sinister version, prompting a connection between both.

== See also ==
- Polish heraldry
- Heraldic family
- List of Polish nobility coats of arms

== Bibliography ==
- Tadeusz Gajl: Herbarz polski od średniowiecza do XX wieku : ponad 4500 herbów szlacheckich 37 tysięcy nazwisk 55 tysięcy rodów. L&L, 2007. ISBN 978-83-60597-10-1.
