= Grigory Khakhanyan =

Georgian-born Soviet corps commander

Grigory Davidovich Khakhanyan
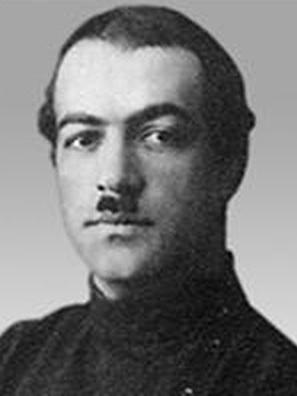
- A Portrait of Grigor Khakhanyan
- Born: January 10, 1896 (O.S. December 29, 1895); Tiflis Governorate, Russian Empire
- Died: February 22, 1939 (aged 43) Soviet Union
- Allegiance: Russian Empire; Soviet Union
- Branch: Imperial Russian Army; Soviet Red Army
- Rank: Komkor
- Conflicts: World War I Russian Civil War

Grigory Davidovich Khakhanyan (Armenian: Գրիգոր Դավթի Խախանյան; January 10, 1896 – February 22, 1939) was a Georgian-born ethnic Armenian Soviet komkor (corps commander). He fought in the Imperial Russian Army in World War I before going over to the Bolsheviks during the subsequent Civil War. During the Great Purge, he was arrested on February 1, 1938, and executed the following year.

== Bibliography ==
- Great Soviet Encyclopedia
- Советская военная энциклопедия
- Хаханьян Григорий Давидович // Военный энциклопедический словарь. Москва, 1973
- Аветисян Г. Незабвенные имена // «Коммунист» № 182 от 2 августа 1988 г. Ереван
- Айрапетян Г. А. Комкор Хаханьян. Ереван, 1970
- Кедров А. Трижды герой // ВЧ. 1971. 4 января
- Савина Н. Комбриг Хаханьян // ВЧ. 1981. 24 июля
- Евланов В. А., Петров С. Д. Почетным оружием награждённые. Москва, 1988
- Василевский А. М. Дело всей жизни. Издание третье. Москва, Политиздат, 1978
- Ахназарян М. Армяне в Рязани / Голос Армении" от 22 марта 2007.
- Материалы о военачальниках Г. Д. Хаханьяне и Г. К. Восканяне: [Публ. документов, 1921—1932 гг. ] // Вести. Ереван, университета: Обществ, науки. 1972. № 2. С. 170—181
- Янгузов З. Ш. Комиссары «нашенского» края. Благовещенск, 1975.
- Краснознамённый Киевский. Очерки истории Краснознамённого Киевского военного округа (1919—1979). Издание второе, исправленное и дополненное. Киев, издательство политической литературы Украины. 1979. С. 82.
- Мильбах В. С. [in Russian] (2007), Особая Краснознамённая Дальневосточная армия (Краснознамённый Дальневосточный фронт). Политические репрессии командно-начальствующего состава, 1937—1938 гг [Special Red Banner Far Eastern Army (Red Banner Far Eastern Front). Political repressions of commanding officers, 1937-1938], СПб.: Изд-во СПбГУ, ISBN 978-5-288-04193-8
- Черушев Н. С. (2003), "Удар по своим. Красная Армия: 1938—1941", Военные тайны XX века [Beat on your own. Red Army: 1938-1941], Moscow: Вече, ISBN 5-94538-366-X
- Черушев Н. С.; Черушев Ю. Н. (2012), Расстрелянная элита РККА (командармы 1-го и 2-го рангов, комкоры, комдивы и им равные): 1937—1941. Биографический словарь [Shot elite of the Red Army (commanders of the 1st and 2nd ranks, comkors, divisional commanders and their equal): 1937-1941. Biographical Dictionary], Moscow: Kuchkovo field; Metropolis [Кучково поле; Мегаполис], pp. 121–122, ISBN 978-5-9950-0217-8
