= Ossów =

- Village
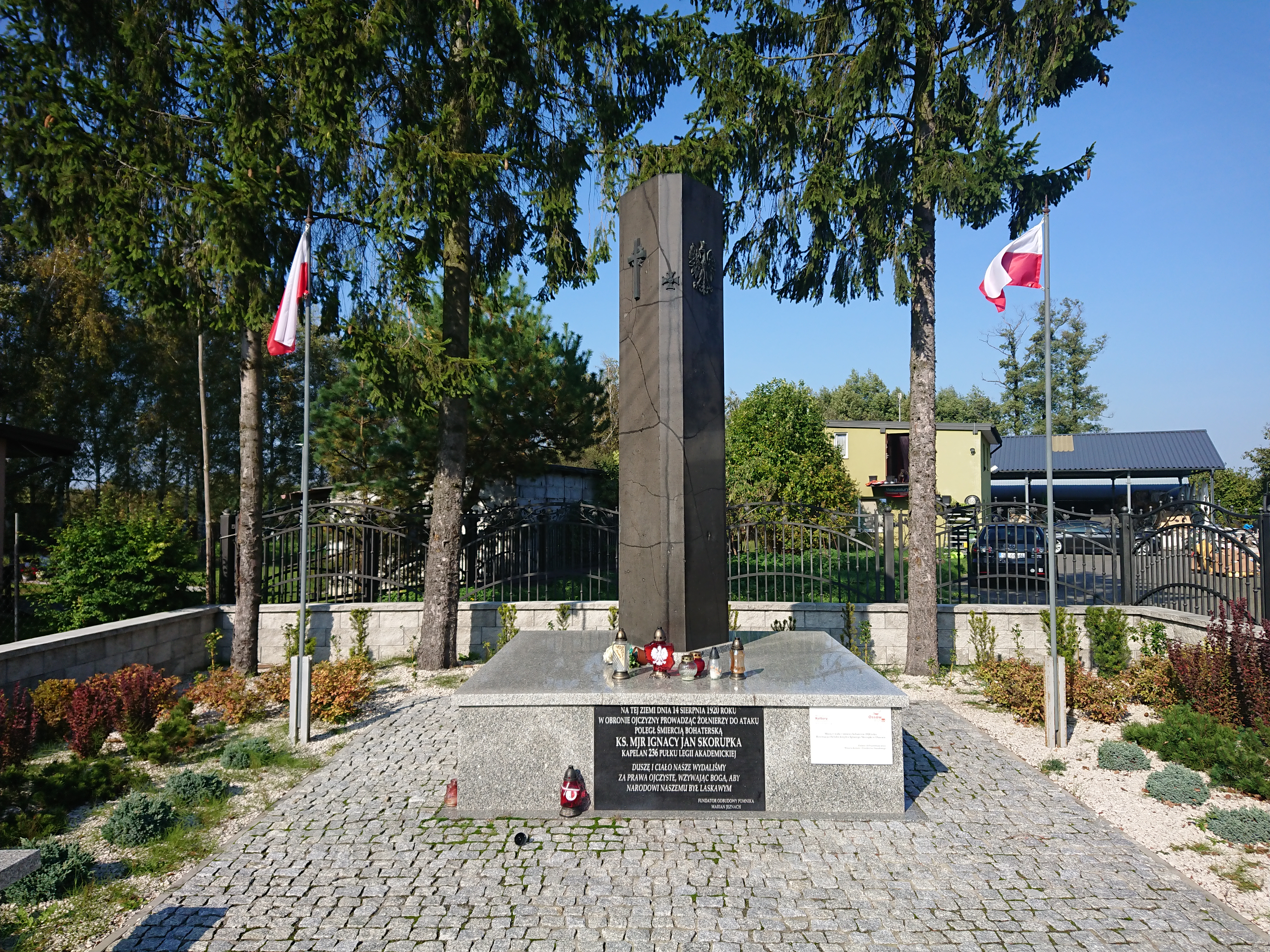
- Ignacy Skorupka obelisk in Ossów

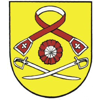
- Coat of arms

- Location within Poland
- Coordinates: 52°18′N 21°13′E
- Country: Poland
- Voivodeship: Masovian
- County: Wołomin
- Gmina: Wołomin
- Time zone: UTC+1 (CET)
  - Summer (DST): UTC+2 (CEST)
- Vehicle registration: WWL

Ossów [ˈɔssuf] is a village in the administrative district of Gmina Wołomin, within Wołomin County, Masovian Voivodeship, in east-central Poland.

In August 1920, the Battle of Ossów was fought there, part of the Battle of Warsaw, in which the Poles were victorious and repulsed the Soviet invasion. Just outside the village, in the neighboring town of Zielonka, there is a cemetery of the fallen Polish soldiers with a chapel of Our Lady of Victory. In Ossów, there is a small museum dedicated to the battle, memorials to Ignacy Skorupka, Polish priest killed in the battle, and a mass grave of 22 fallen Soviet soldiers.
