= Lipinki, Wołomin County =

Lipinki
- Village
- Location within Poland
- Coordinates: 52°22′19″N 21°17′24″E
- Country: Poland
- Voivodeship: Masovian
- County: Wołomin
- Gmina: Wołomin
- Population: 850

Lipinki [lʲiˈpʲiŋkʲi] is a village in the administrative district of Gmina Wołomin, within Wołomin County, Masovian Voivodeship, in east-central Poland.
