= Leśniakowizna =

- Village
- Location within Poland
- Coordinates: 52°19′00″N 21°16′12″E
- Country: Poland
- Voivodeship: Masovian
- County: Wołomin
- Gmina: Wołomin
- Population: 465

Leśniakowizna [lɛɕɲakɔˈvizna] is a village in the administrative district of Gmina Wołomin, within Wołomin County, Masovian Voivodeship, in east-central Poland.
