= Zielonka =

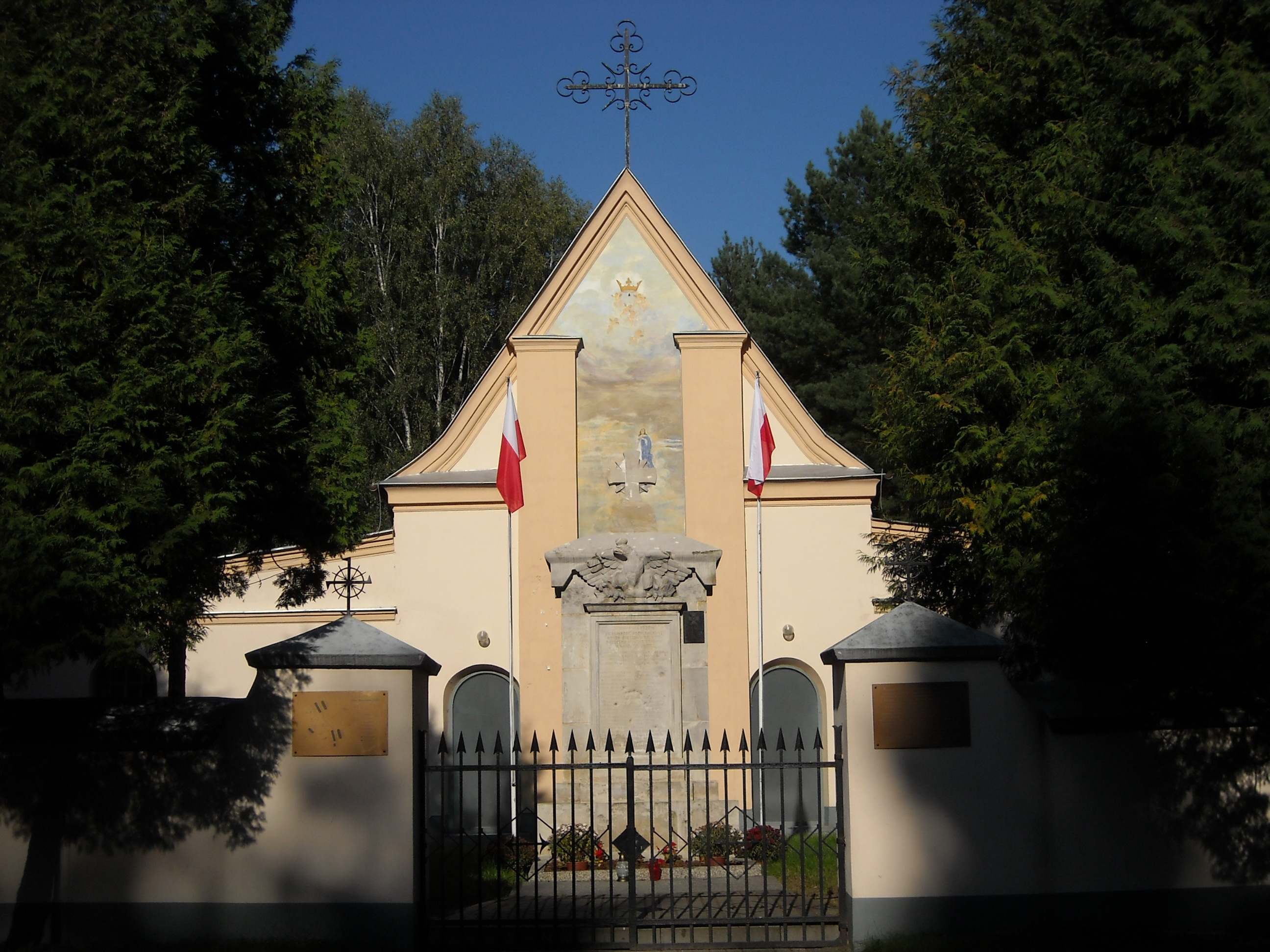
- Polish military cemetery and chapel of Our Lady of Victory

- Coat of arms

- Location within Poland
- Coordinates: 52°18′3″N 21°9′31″E
- Country: Poland
- Voivodeship: Masovian
- County: Wołomin
- Gmina: Zielonka (urban gmina)
- Town rights: 1960

Government
  - Mayor: Kamil Michał Iwandowski

Area
  - Total: 79.23 km^{2} (30.59 sq mi)

Population (2013)
  - Total: 17,398
  - Density: 219.6/km^{2} (568.7/sq mi)
- Time zone: UTC+1 (CET)
  - Summer (DST): UTC+2 (CEST)
- Postal code: 05-220
- Area code: +48 22
- Car plates: WWL
- Website: http://www.zielonka.pl

Zielonka [ʑɛˈlɔnka] is a town in Wołomin County, Masovian Voivodeship, Poland, with 17,398 inhabitants (2013). It is located about 13 km (8 mi) to the north-east of the centre of Warsaw.

Zielonka borders Warsaw and several other towns of the Warsaw metropolitan area: Ząbki and Marki in the west, Kobyłka in the north, and Sulejówek in the south. It was granted town rights in 1960.

In August 1920, the Battle of Ossów was fought nearby, as part of the Battle of Warsaw in which the Poles were victorious and repulsed the Soviet invasion. Within the town limits, near the village of Ossów, there is a cemetery of the fallen Polish soldiers with a chapel of Our Lady of Victory.

== Public structures ==
- 4 primary schools
- a high school
- 2 Roman Catholic churches
- a sports centre
- 4 banks
- a large proving ground which occupies about 2/3 of the municipality area
- 1 Ufnal

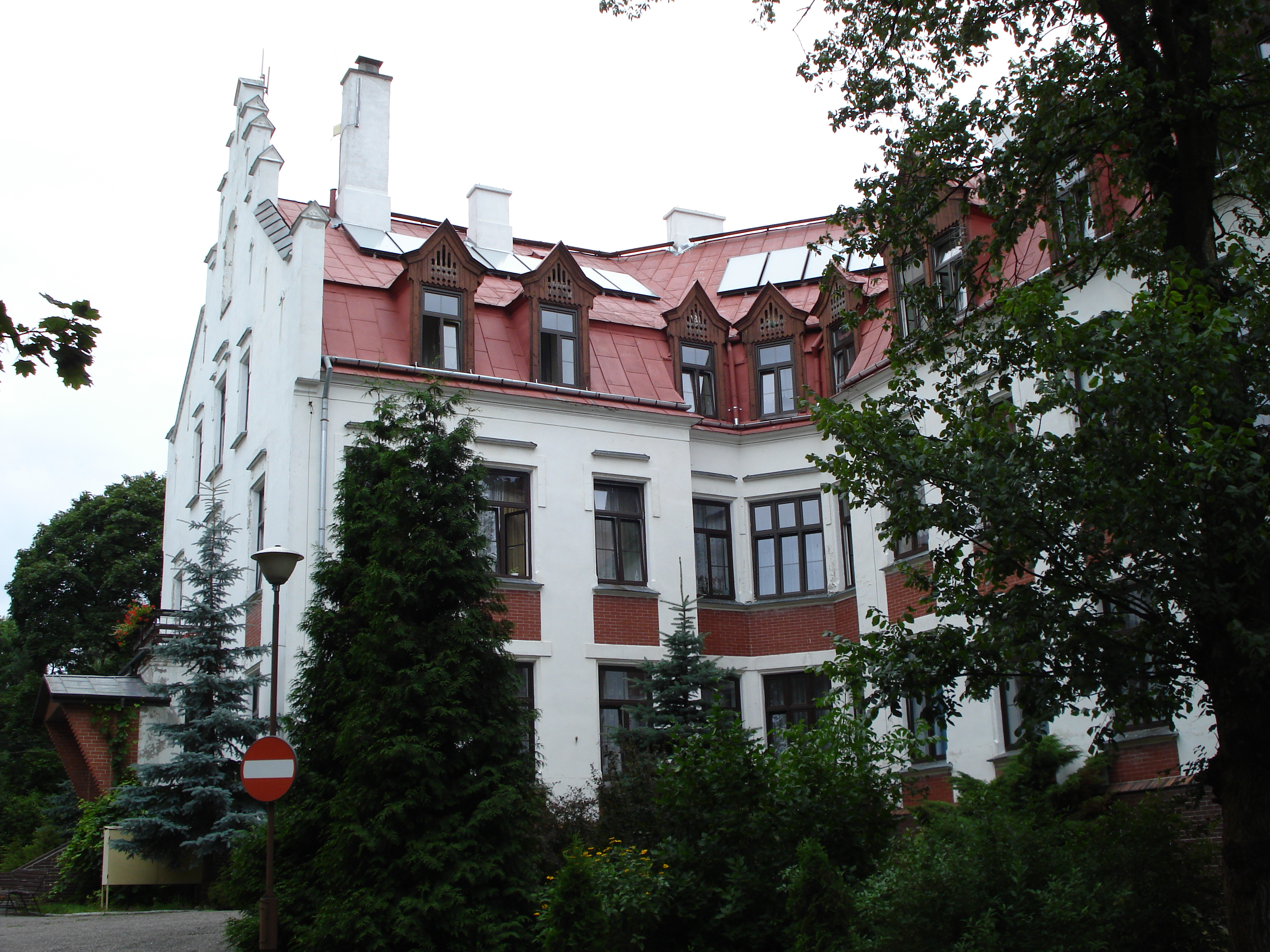
Retirement house in Zielonka

== Transport ==
There are two railway stations in the town (Zielonka and Zielonka Bankowa).

== Nature ==
- Długa River
- 4 clay pits
- 2 nature reserves
- 86 trees registered as natural monuments
