= Volunteer Army (Poland) =

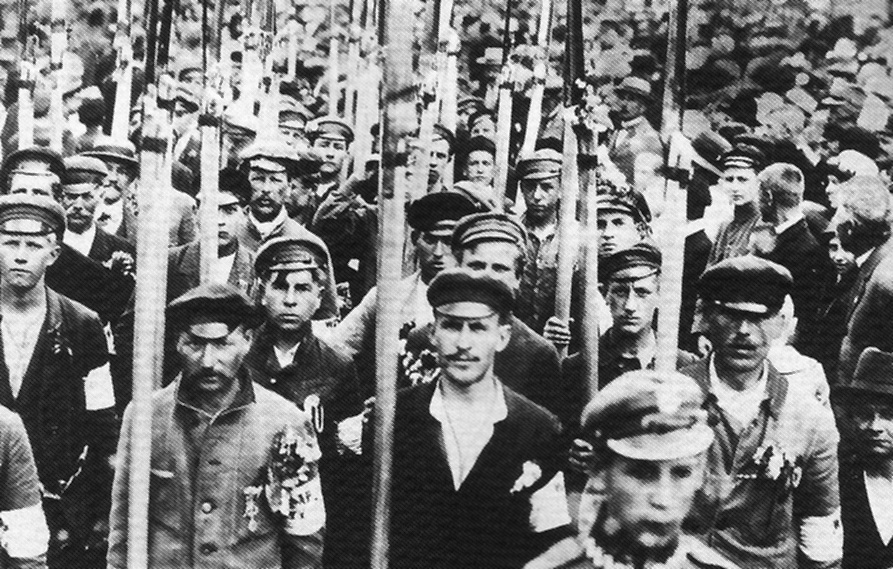
In the summer of 1920 there were barely any weapons for the regular Polish Army units. Thus many regular regiments received reinforcements armed with nothing more than war scythes

The Volunteer Army (Polish: Armia Ochotnicza) was a military formation of the Polish Army, created at the height of the Polish–Soviet War. It was formed by the Council of National Defense on July 1, 1920. Composed entirely of volunteers, the formation did not enter combat as a single entity. Instead, its regiments were attached to other armies or used to replenish the manpower of battle-weary divisions. The army was commanded by Gen. Józef Haller.

By the end of September 1920, 105,714 men volunteered for service. Out of them, sixteen regiments of infantry and seven of cavalry were created, in addition to other units. Out of the infantry regiments, only six took part in actual combat; the rest were used as reserves. Following the armistice, most of the volunteers were demobilised.

== Background ==
In late May 1920, after Polish forces had entered Kiev (see Kiev offensive (1920)), the Red Army began its offensive, which resulted in fast advancing of the Soviets and retreat of Polish forces. In June 1920 in Warsaw, the government of Leopold Skulski was dismissed, and the new cabinet of Wladyslaw Grabski was not created until June 23. The new Prime Minister, well aware of the disastrous situation, created Council of National Defense (July 1, 1920), which was authorized to take decisions regarding the war.

The most important task was to mobilize the nation and its resources in defence of the Bolshevik invasion. The Council was headed by Naczelnik Panstwa (head of state) Józef Piłsudski and its competences were limitless. On the first day of its creation, the new body, following the notion of Prime Minister, created the Volunteer Army. On July 3, the Council issued an appeal to the nation, in which all citizens of the Commonwealth were urged to join the military. The appeal was supported by all political parties, except for Communists.

== Creation ==
On July 8, 1920, Minister of Military Affairs, General Kazimierz Sosnkowski issued Order Nr 70 29/Org., upon which General Inspectorate of the Volunteer Army was created; Józef Haller became the General Inspector of the Volunteer Army.

Polish society responded to the appeal with enthusiasm. By October 1, 1920, 105,714 people volunteered, with most of them, 49,8%, joining the infantry. The first volunteer division was officially formed on July 22 in Modlin, with Adam Koc as its commandant. The division consisted of 101. Reserve and 201., 202. and 205. Volunteer Regiments.

Of its four regiments, three were dissolved in November 1920, while the 101. Reserve continued its existence after the Polish – Soviet War. It was reinforced by soldiers of the volunteer regiments, and officers of the former Siberian Division, and renamed into 3rd Siberian Regiment.

Altogether, the Polish Volunteer Army consisted of six infantry regiments, ten reserve infantry regiments, and seven cavalry regiments.
