= Dybów-Folwark =

- Village
- Location within Poland
- Coordinates: 52°25′30″N 21°13′1″E
- Country: Poland
- Voivodeship: Masovian
- County: Wołomin
- Gmina: Radzymin
- Population: 410

Dybów-Folwark [ˈdɨbuf ˈfɔlvark] is a village in the administrative district of Gmina Radzymin, within Wołomin County, Masovian Voivodeship, in east-central Poland.
