= Słupno, Wołomin County =

Słupno
- Village
- Location within Poland
- Coordinates: 52°23′43″N 21°8′40″E
- Country: Poland
- Voivodeship: Masovian
- County: Wołomin
- Gmina: Radzymin
- Population: 1,500

Słupno [ˈswupnɔ] is a village in the administrative district of Gmina Radzymin, within Wołomin County, Masovian Voivodeship, in east-central Poland.
