= Dybów-Kolonia =

- Village
- Location within Poland
- Coordinates: 52°24′16″N 21°12′30″E
- Country: Poland
- Voivodeship: Masovian
- County: Wołomin
- Gmina: Radzymin

Population (approx.)
  - Total: 300
- Time zone: UTC+1 (CET)
  - Summer (DST): UTC+2 (CEST)

Dybów-Kolonia [ˈdɨbuf kɔˈlɔɲa] is a village in the administrative district of Gmina Radzymin, within Wołomin County, Masovian Voivodeship, in east-central Poland.

Five Polish citizens were murdered by Nazi Germany in the village during World War II.
