= Wiktorów, Wołomin County =

Wiktorów
- Village
- Location within Poland
- Coordinates: 52°24′51″N 21°13′39″E
- Country: Poland
- Voivodeship: Masovian
- County: Wołomin
- Gmina: Radzymin
- Population (approx.): 130

Wiktorów [vikˈtɔruf] is a village in the administrative district of Gmina Radzymin, within Wołomin County, Masovian Voivodeship, in east-central Poland.
