= Sieraków, Wołomin County =

Sieraków
- Village
- Location within Poland
- Coordinates: 52°24′9″N 21°7′27″E
- Country: Poland
- Voivodeship: Masovian
- County: Wołomin
- Gmina: Radzymin

Sieraków (Polish pronunciation: [ɕɛˈrakuf]) is a village in the administrative district of Gmina Radzymin, within Wołomin County, Masovian Voivodeship, in east-central Poland.
