= Stary Janków =

- Village
- Location within Poland
- Coordinates: 52°23′N 21°13′E
- Country: Poland
- Voivodeship: Masovian
- County: Wołomin
- Gmina: Radzymin

Stary Janków [ˈstarɨ ˈjaŋkuf] is a village in the administrative district of Gmina Radzymin, within Wołomin County, Masovian Voivodeship, in east-central Poland.
