= Ciemne, Masovian Voivodeship =

Ciemne
- Village
- Location within Poland
- Coordinates: 52°23′38″N 21°11′19″E
- Country: Poland
- Voivodeship: Masovian
- County: Wołomin
- Gmina: Radzymin
- Population (approx.): 760

Ciemne [ˈt͡ɕɛmnɛ] is a village in the administrative district of Gmina Radzymin, within Wołomin County, Masovian Voivodeship, in east-central Poland.
