= Emilianów, Wołomin County =

Emilianów
- Village
- Location within Poland
- Coordinates: 52°26′42″N 21°15′33″E
- Country: Poland
- Voivodeship: Masovian
- County: Wołomin
- Gmina: Radzymin

Emilianów [ɛmiˈljanuf] is a village in the administrative district of Gmina Radzymin, within Wołomin County, Masovian Voivodeship, in east-central Poland.
