= Stare Załubice =

- Village
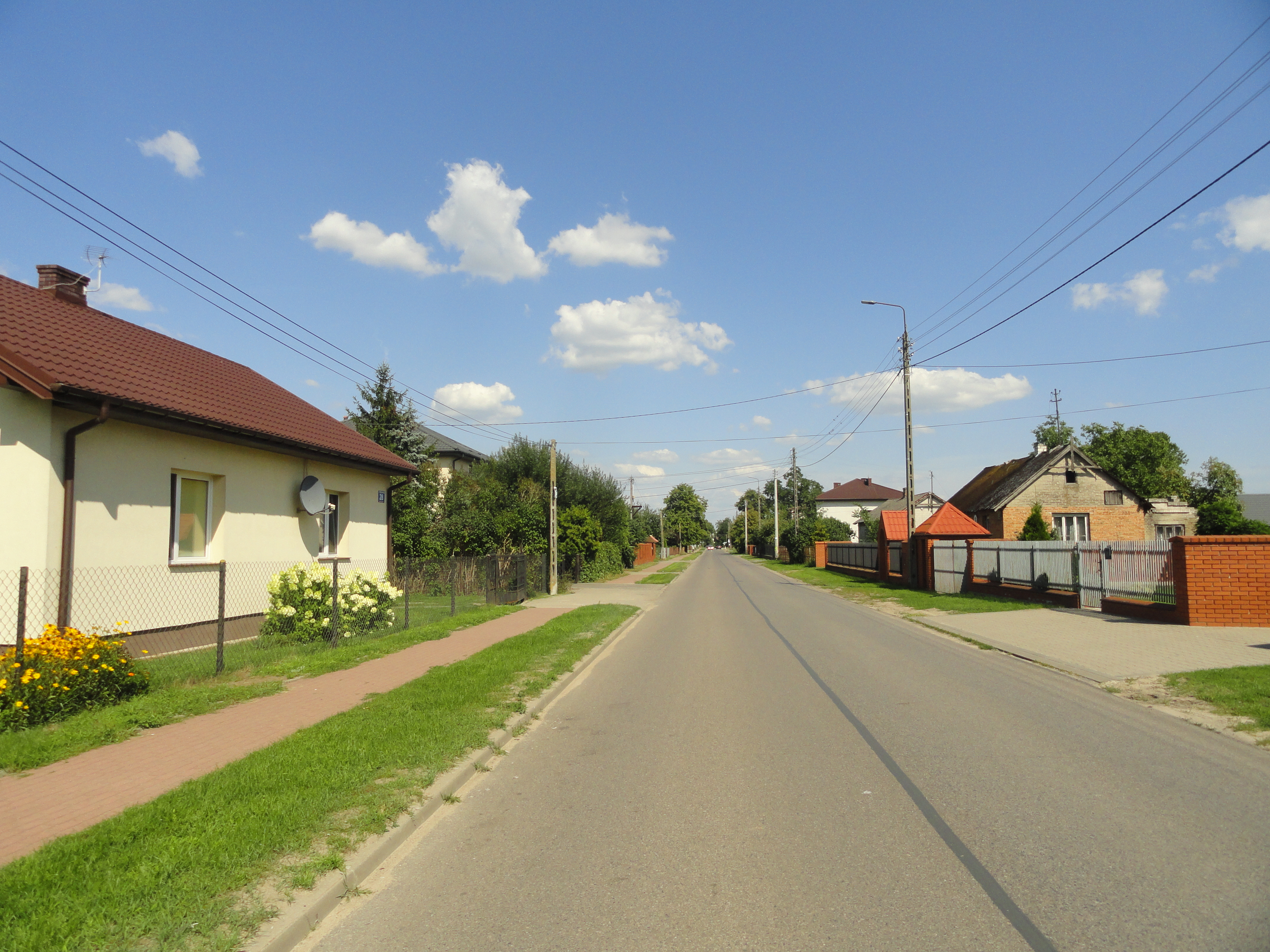

- Location within Poland
- Coordinates: 52°28′52″N 21°07′16″E
- Country: Poland
- Voivodeship: Masovian
- County: Wołomin
- Gmina: Radzymin

Population
  - Total: 749
- Time zone: UTC+1 (CET)
  - Summer (DST): UTC+2 (CEST)
- Website: http://www.zalubice.info

Stare Załubice [ˈstarɛ zawuˈbit͡sɛ] is a village in the administrative district of Gmina Radzymin, within Wołomin County, Masovian Voivodeship, in east-central Poland.

Six Polish citizens were murdered by Nazi Germany in Stare Załubice and Wolica during World War II.
