= Gmina Radzymin =

Gmina Radzymin Radzymin Commune
- Gmina
- Flag Coat of arms

- Location within Poland
- Coordinates (Radzymin): 52°25′N 21°11′E
- Country: Poland
- Voivodeship: Masovian
- County: Wołomin
- Seat: Radzymin

Area
  - Total: 130.93 km^{2} (50.55 sq mi)

Population (2013)
  - Total: 24,548
  - Density: 187.49/km^{2} (485.60/sq mi)
  - Urban: 11,378
  - Rural: 13,170
- Website: http://radzymin.pl/

Gmina Radzymin is an urban-rural gmina (administrative district) in Wołomin County, Masovian Voivodeship, in east-central Poland. Its seat is the town of Radzymin, which lies approximately 9 kilometres (6 mi) north-west of Wołomin and 26 km (16 mi) north-east of Warsaw.

The gmina covers an area of 130.93 square kilometres (50.6 sq mi), and as of 2006 its total population is 19,129 (out of which the population of Radzymin amounts to 7,864, and the population of the rural part of the gmina is 11,265).

== Villages ==
Apart from the town of Radzymin, Gmina Radzymin contains the villages and settlements of Arciechów, Borki, Cegielnia, Ciemne, Dybów-Folwark, Dybów-Górki, Dybów-Kolonia, Emilianów, Łąki, Łosie, Mokre, Nadma, Nowe Załubice, Nowy Janków, Opole, Popielarze, Ruda, Rżyska, Sieraków, Słupno, Stare Załubice, Stary Dybów, Stary Janków, Wiktorów, Zawady and Zwierzyniec.

== Neighbouring gminas ==
Gmina Radzymin is bordered by the towns of Kobyłka and Marki, and by the gminas of Dąbrówka, Klembów, Nieporęt, Serock and Wołomin.
