= Nowe Załubice =

- Village
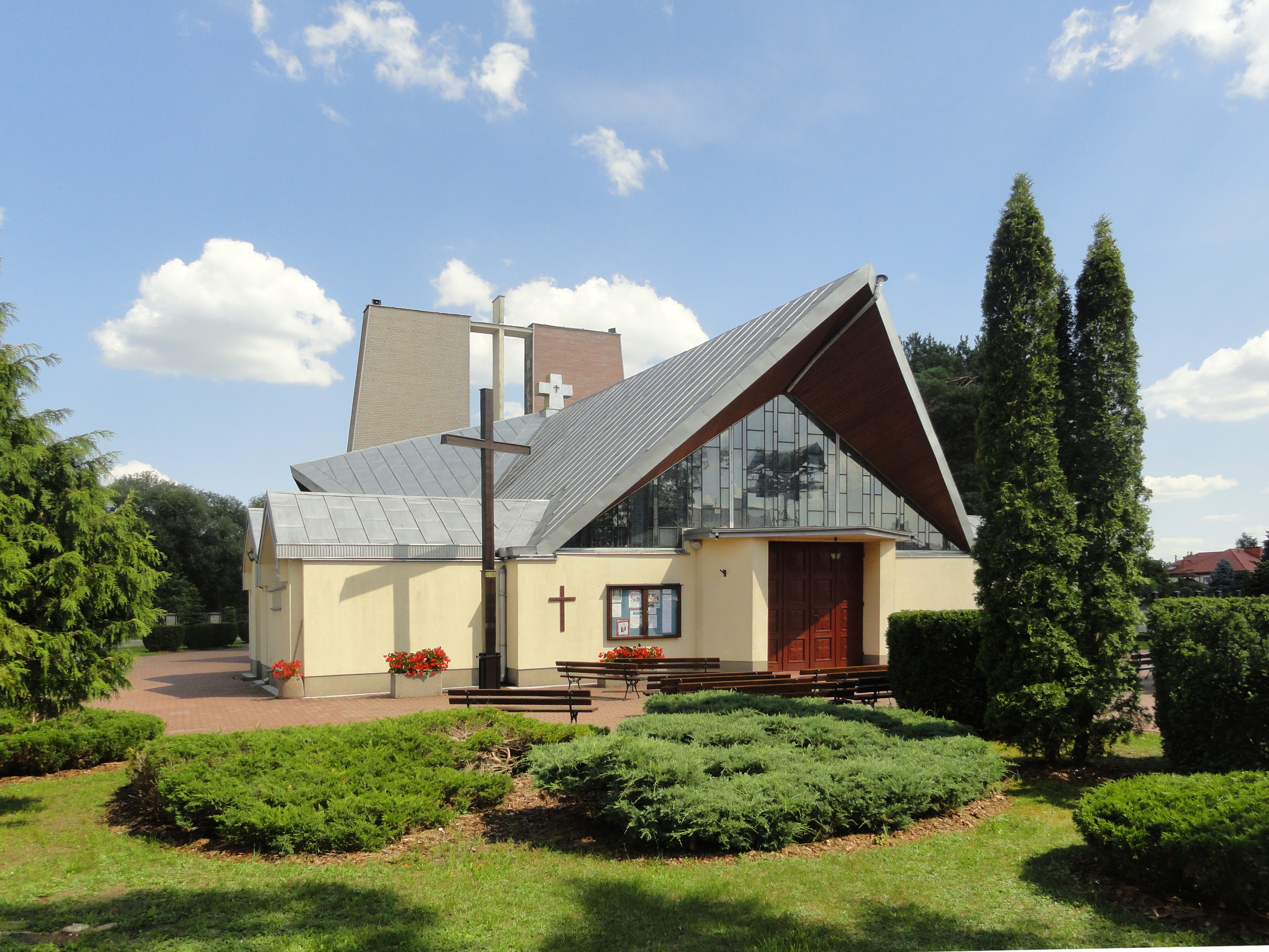

- Location within Poland
- Coordinates: 52°29′0″N 21°8′38″E
- Country: Poland
- Voivodeship: Masovian
- County: Wołomin
- Gmina: Radzymin
- Population: 359

Nowe Załubice [ˈnɔvɛ zawuˈbit͡sɛ] is a village in the administrative district of Gmina Radzymin, within Wołomin County, Masovian Voivodeship, in east-central Poland.
