= Arciechów, Wołomin County =

Arciechów
- Village
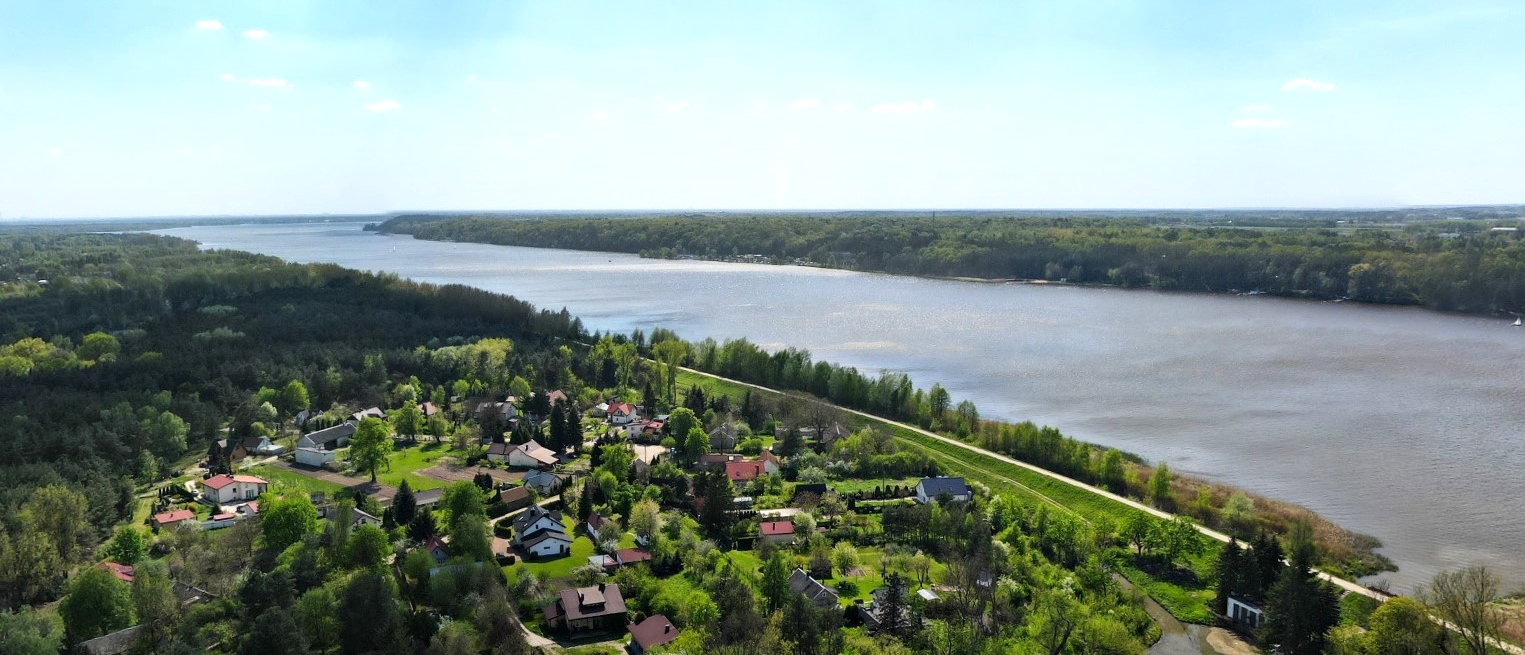
- Aerial view of Arciechów

- Location within Poland
- Coordinates: 52°29′56″N 21°4′56″E
- Country: Poland
- Voivodeship: Masovian
- County: Wołomin
- Gmina: Radzymin

Population (2022)
  - Total: 319
- Postal code: 05-255
- Area code: +48 22
- Vehicle registration: WWL

Arciechów [arˈt͡ɕɛxuf] is a village in the administrative district of Gmina Radzymin, within Wołomin County, Masovian Voivodeship, in east-central Poland.

The village is a recreational area located on the shore of the Zegrze Reservoir. The entire village is within the boundaries of the Warsaw Landscape Protected Area.

A private noble village named Arciechowo was located in the second half of the 16th century in the Kamieńczyk County of the Mazovian Voivodeship. From 1975 to 1998, the village was part of the Warsaw Voivodeship.

Until 1992, the village of Arciechów was part of the parish of Serock. For several decades in the 20th century, a permanent ferry crossing operated from Arciechów to Serock across the Narew River. In 2019, after a long break, a holiday catamaran ferry service was launched on the same route. They take place every weekend of the holiday season and are very popular among tourists.
