= Zegrze Fortress =

Coordinates: 52°27′48″N 21°01′41″E

- Twierdza Zegrze
- Part of Warsaw Fortress, Modlin Fortress
- Northern Poland
- Plan of the fortress

Site information
- Type: Fortified bridgehead
- Owner: National Bank of Poland
- Controlled by: Russia, Poland
- Open to the public: No

Site history
- Built: 1892-1895
- In use: 1935-1969
- Materials: Earthwork, concrete and steel

The Zegrze Fortress (Polish: Twierdza Zegrze) is a military structure located in Zegrze, Poland, on a high escarpment over the Narew River. Built in late 19th century by the Russian Empire, it was to guard a river crossing across the Narew. Modernised between 1902 and 1907, it was part of the so-called Warsaw Fortified Area (Russian: Варшавской укрепленной район) comprising three major nodes: the Warsaw Fortress, Modlin Fortress and Zegrze.

The main body of the fortress consisted of two forts joined with an earthwork fortification, the so-called Large Fortification (Polish: Umocnienie Duże, Fort Ordon) and Small Fortification (Polish: Umocnienie Małe, Fort Karlinek). In addition to that, the fortress also commanded two additional forts: Fort Dębe located some 10 kilometres downstream, in the direction of Modlin, and Fort Beniaminów located across Narew. Apart from fortifications, the complex also included barracks at Beniaminów, Zagroby and Zegrze, seven munitions depots and a garrison church.

The fortress took part in the Great Retreat of the Russian forces from Poland in 1915, during World War I. After 1918 it was taken over by Poland and took part in the battle of Warsaw of 1920 and later the defence against the Nazi and Soviet invasion of Poland in 1939. In recent years the Large Fortification was acquired by the National Bank of Poland.
