= Nowy Janków =

- Village
- Location within Poland
- Coordinates: 52°22′32″N 21°11′54″E
- Country: Poland
- Voivodeship: Masovian
- County: Wołomin
- Gmina: Radzymin

Nowy Janków [ˈnɔvɨ ˈjaŋkuf] is a village in the administrative district of Gmina Radzymin, within Wołomin County, Masovian Voivodeship, in east-central Poland.
