= Popielarze, Wołomin County =

Popielarze
- Village
- Location within Poland
- Coordinates: 52°30′37″N 21°8′6″E
- Country: Poland
- Voivodeship: Masovian
- County: Wołomin
- Gmina: Radzymin

Popielarze [pɔpjɛˈlaʐɛ] is a village in the administrative district of Gmina Radzymin, within Wołomin County, Masovian Voivodeship, in east-central Poland.
