= Nadma =

- Village
- Location within Poland
- Coordinates: 52°21′39″N 21°10′5″E
- Country: Poland
- Voivodeship: Masovian
- County: Wołomin
- Gmina: Radzymin
- Population: 1,420

Nadma [ˈnadma] is a village in the administrative district of Gmina Radzymin, within Wołomin County, Masovian Voivodeship, in east-central Poland.
