= Zwierzyniec, Wołomin County =

Zwierzyniec
- Village
- Location within Poland
- Coordinates: 52°26′45″N 21°14′10″E
- Country: Poland
- Voivodeship: Masovian
- County: Wołomin
- Gmina: Radzymin
- Population (approx.): 170

Zwierzyniec (Polish pronunciation: [zvjɛˈʐɨɲɛt͡s]) is a village in the administrative district of Gmina Radzymin, within Wołomin County, Masovian Voivodeship, in east-central Poland.
