= Łosie, Masovian Voivodeship =

Łosie
- Village
- Location within Poland
- Coordinates: 52°27′26″N 21°10′53″E
- Country: Poland
- Voivodeship: Masovian
- County: Wołomin
- Gmina: Radzymin

Łosie [ˈwɔɕɛ] is a village in the administrative district of Gmina Radzymin, within Wołomin County, Masovian Voivodeship, in east-central Poland.
