= Stefan Pogonowski =

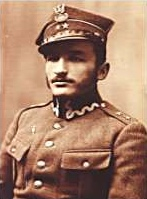
- Born: 12 February 1895; Domaniew, Congress Poland
- Died: 15 August 1920; Wólka Radzymińska, Poland
- Occupation: Soldier

Stefan Pogonowski (12 February 1895 – 15 August 1920) was a Polish professional soldier and military officer. He served in the Imperial Russian Army during World War I and then the newly recreated Polish Army during the Polish-Bolshevist War of 1920. He was killed when leading a charge of a battalion he commanded during the battle of Radzymin. He was posthumously awarded the Silver Cross of Virtuti Militari and promoted to the rank of captain. There are streets named after him in Łódź and Warsaw.

== Early life ==
Pogonowski was born in the Domaniew estate to Ryszard Pogonowski and Helena Marecki. He was one of 9 siblings, including: Władysław, who died in childhood, Lucjan, Ryszard, his twin Marianna, Stanisław (b. 1896), Stanisław (1898-1934), Janina (b. 1902), and Anna (b. 1908).
