= Cegielnia, Wołomin County =

Cegielnia
- Village
- Location within Poland
- Coordinates: 52°24′0″N 21°9′38″E
- Country: Poland
- Voivodeship: Masovian
- County: Wołomin
- Gmina: Radzymin
- Population (approx.): 760

Cegielnia [t͡sɛˈɡʲɛlɲa] is a village in the administrative district of Gmina Radzymin, within Wołomin County, Masovian Voivodeship, in east-central Poland.
