= Haller coat of arms =

Polish coat of arms

Haller
- Alternative name: none
- Earliest mention: 1793
- Towns: none
- Families: Haller von Hallenburg, also: Haller de Hallenburg

Haller is a Polish coat of arms. It was used by the Polish-German Haller de Hallenburg family. The surname Haller was first found in Saxony, where the name could be considered to have made an early contribution to the feudal society which became the backbone of the early development of Europe. The name probably derived from the city of Halle, and became prominent in local affairs and branched into many houses which played important roles in the savage tribal and national conflicts, as each group sought power and status in an unstable territorial profile.

== Blazon ==
<Quarterly I & IV or three trefoils slipped vert, II & III gules a chevron or. Crest: issuant out of a crest coronet or three ostrich feathers vert argent and gules. Mantled dexter vert doubled or and sinister gules doubled or.>

== Notable bearers ==
Notable bearers of this coat of arms include:

- Józef Haller de Hallenburg
- Stanisław Haller de Hallenburg

== See also ==
- Polish heraldry
- Heraldic family
- List of Polish nobility coats of arms

== Bibliography ==
- Księga herbowa rodów polskich J.K.Ostrowskiego podaje srebrny kolor podbicia labrów.
