= Jurczyce, Lesser Poland Voivodeship =

Jurczyce
- Village
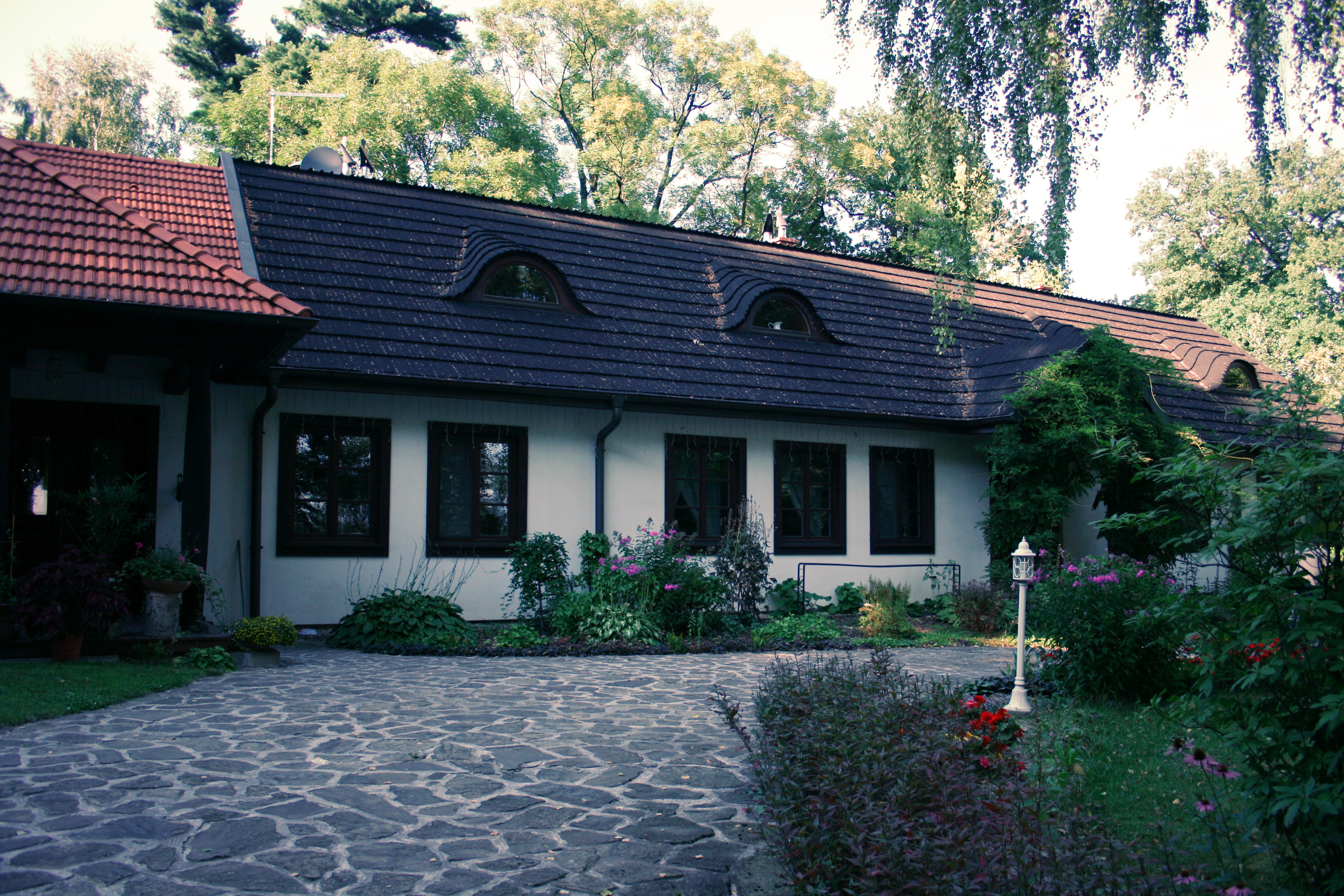
- Manor house
- Interactive map of Jurczyce
- Location within Poland
- Coordinates: 49°57′N 19°49′E
- Country: Poland
- Voivodeship: Lesser Poland
- County: Kraków
- Gmina: Skawina

Jurczyce [jurˈt͡ʂɨt͡sɛ] is a village in the administrative district of Gmina Skawina, within Kraków County, Lesser Poland Voivodeship, in southern Poland. It is the birthplace of Polish Army general Józef Haller.
