= Dybów-Górki =

- Village
- Location within Poland
- Coordinates: 52°26′1″N 21°12′45″E
- Country: Poland
- Voivodeship: Masovian
- County: Wołomin
- Gmina: Radzymin

Dybów-Górki [ˈdɨbuf ˈɡurki] is a village in the administrative district of Gmina Radzymin, within Wołomin County, Masovian Voivodeship, in east-central Poland.
