= Borki, Gmina Radzymin =

Borki
- Village
- Location within Poland
- Coordinates: 52°27′56″N 21°7′3″E
- Country: Poland
- Voivodeship: Masovian
- County: Wołomin
- Gmina: Radzymin
- Population (approx.): 250

Borki [ˈbɔrki] is a village in the administrative district of Gmina Radzymin, within Wołomin County, Masovian Voivodeship, in east-central Poland.
