= Maciejówka (cap) =

Type of Polish headgear

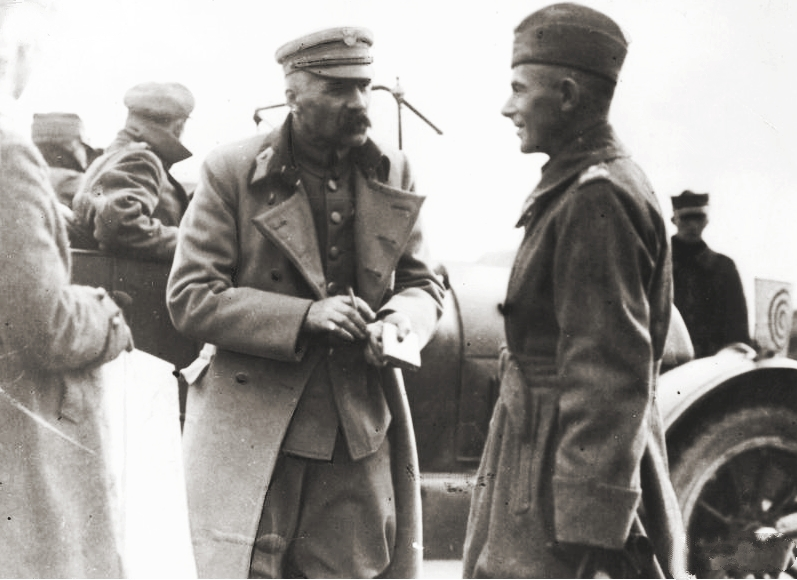
Józef Piłsudski in a Polish Legion maciejówka

Maciejówka (literally "Maciej's cap") is a type of headgear popular in late 19th and early 20th century Poland. It is a round, soft cap made of cloth, with a short hardened peak, usually made of black or brown leather, often adorned with a decorative rope or braid. Originally part of traditional folk attire in many regions of Poland, during World War I it became part of the military uniform of the Riflemen's Association and the Polish Legions.

After Poland regained her independence in 1918 it was proposed that the maciejówka become the standard headgear of the Polish Army. However, it was argued that the maciejówka resembles German World War I garrison caps too closely and eventually the rogatywka was adopted instead.

== Similar caps ==
- The Kashket, a cap with decorative oak leaf embroidery, is traditionally worn by Poles of Jewish descent.
- The Lenin cap has been worn for years by workers and peasants in Russia.
