= Fort Beniaminów =

Coordinates: 52°26′17″N 21°05′55″E

Fort Beniaminów is a military installation in Beniaminów, some 20 kilometres (12 mi) east of Warsaw. Designed by a Polish-born Russian General Konstanty Wieliczko, the fort was constructed in 1904 as part of the outer ring of defences of the Warsaw Fortress. Conveniently located near the southern bank of Bugonarew, it was to shield the then-Russian city of Warsaw from an enemy force trying to attack it from the East: possibly a German Army trying to outflank the Russian army from East Prussia. It was to cooperate with two earlier forts in Wawer and Kawęczyn (built between 1892 and 1893) and two more modern forts in Pustelniki and Maciołki (their construction never started).

The fort was almost finished in 1909, when - in the effect of the lost Russo-Japanese War a set of military reforms was passed by the Russian government. As a consequence the Warsaw Fortress was disbanded and the Russian Army started dismantling all the forts in the vicinity of Warsaw. Fort Beniaminów was not demolished, but all armaments and supplies were removed and the construction abandoned in 1913.

Consequently the fort did not play any part in World War I and in 1915 was captured by the Imperial German Army without a fight. The Germans re-militarised the construction and used its barracks as a military prison housing, among others, the soldiers of the Polish Legions following the Oath Crisis. During the Polish-Bolshevist War of 1920 the Polish Army used the fort in the Battle of Radzymin (part of the Battle of Warsaw), but the construction was not involved in direct combat as the Russian forces never reached it.

Between the World Wars the barracks of the fort, located some 3 kilometres (1.9 mi) away in Białobrzegi, were used by the 2nd Radio-telegraphic Battalion. Following the German and Soviet invasion of Poland in 1939 the fort was taken over by the Wehrmacht and slightly modernised. The barracks again served as a prison, this time in the form of Stalag 368 for Soviet prisoners of war. In 1944 the fort was captured by Soviet forces and partially blown up (all gun casemates for flanking fire and the caponiers).

Currently the fort is in private hands. Parts of the military infrastructure of the barracks houses the 9th Command Regiment, while the rest were transformed into apartment houses.
