= Mokre, Masovian Voivodeship =

Mokre
- Village
- Location within Poland
- Coordinates: 52°26′38″N 21°11′28″E
- Country: Poland
- Voivodeship: Masovian
- County: Wołomin
- Gmina: Radzymin
- Population: 330

Mokre [ˈmɔkrɛ] is a village in the administrative district of Gmina Radzymin, within Wołomin County, Masovian Voivodeship, in east-central Poland.
