= Ruda, Wołomin County =

Ruda
- Village
- Location within Poland
- Coordinates: 52°27′50″N 21°8′37″E
- Country: Poland
- Voivodeship: Masovian
- County: Wołomin
- Gmina: Radzymin
- Population (approx.): 290

Ruda [ˈruda] is a village in the administrative district of Gmina Radzymin, within Wołomin County, Masovian Voivodeship, in east-central Poland.
