= Józef Haller =

General of the Polish Army (1873–1960)

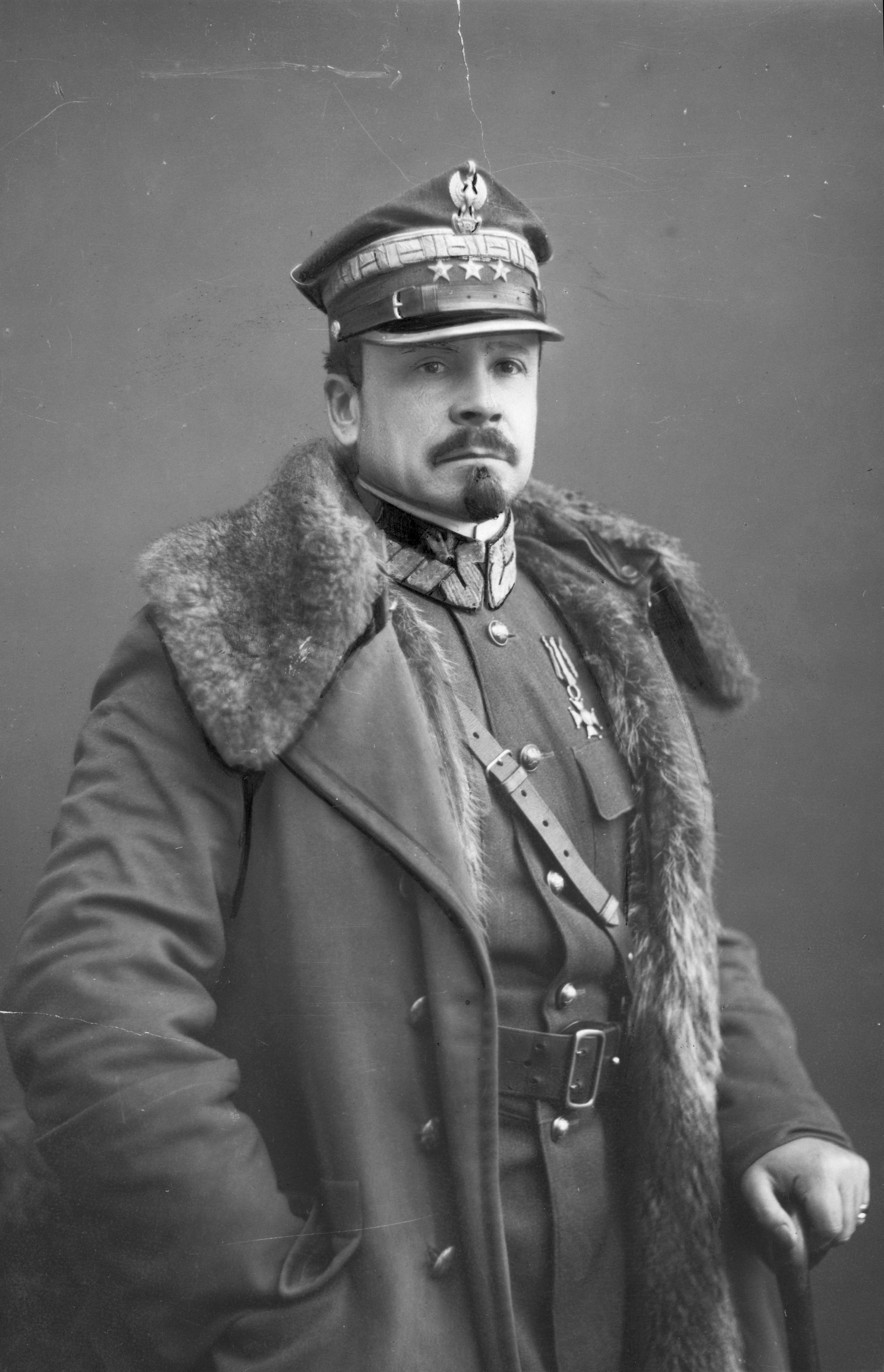
- Haller
- Born: 13 August 1873; Jurczyce, Galicia and Lodomeria, Austria-Hungary
- Died: 4 June 1960 (aged 86); London, Greater London, England
- Military career
- Allegiance: Austria-Hungary (1895–1910, 1914–1918); Third French Republic (1918); Second Polish Republic (1918–1920)
- Branch: Austro-Hungarian Army; Polish Legions; Polish Army
- Service years: 1895–1910; 1914–1920
- Rank: Lieutenant General
- Conflicts: First World War; Polish–Ukrainian War; Polish–Soviet War
- Awards: Order of the White Eagle Silver Cross of Virtuti Militari Commandrr's Cross of Polonia Restituta Cross of Valor Signum Laudis (Austria-Hungary) Legion of Honour (France) War Cross (Francja) Victory Medal

Józef Haller von Hallenburg (or de Hallenburg; Polish pronunciation: [/ˈju.zɛf ˈxal.lɛr/]; 13 August 1873 – 4 June 1960) was a Polish lieutenant general and legionary in the Polish Legions during the First World War. He was a harcmistrz (the highest Scouting instructor rank in Poland), the president of the Polish Scouting and Guiding Association (ZHP), and a political and social activist. He was also the cousin of Stanisław Haller.

Haller was born in Jurczyce. He studied at Vienna's Technical Military Academy and subsequently (1895–1906) served with the Austrian Army, resigning after reaching the rank of captain. He supported the paramilitary pro-independence Polish organization Sokół. In 1916, during the First World War, he became commander of the Second Brigade of the Polish Legion, in particular the units which fought against Russia on the Eastern Front.

In 1918, in the aftermath of the "Charge at Rarańcza", as commander of the 2nd Polish Auxiliary Corps with the Austrian Army, Haller broke through the Austro-Russian front line to Ukraine, where he united his troops with Polish detachments which had left the Tsarist army. He protested the Treaty of Brest-Litovsk and continued to fight the Russians with his II Brigade of the Polish Legions (later, the 4th and 5th Rifle Divisions of the Polish II Corps). Under the pressure of the Germans, who after the Peace of Brest-Litovsk regarded the presence of Polish troops in Ukraine as illegal, and a fierce battle between Poles and Germans at Kaniów (10 May 1918, 2500 casualties) his corps was interned, while the Brigadier himself managed to escape to Moscow.

Subsequently, by the way of Murmansk, he arrived in France in July 1918, where on behalf of the Polish National Committee he created what was known as the Blue Army (from the color of its French uniforms, also known as Haller's Army). For the next few months his army, allied to the Entente, would fight against Germany. In 1919, at the new army's head, he arrived in Poland and was dispatched to the Ukrainian front. During the Polish-Soviet War he commanded an army of volunteers. He was also Inspector General of the Army and a member of the War Council.

In 1920–1927 Haller was a deputy to the Sejm. After the election of Gabriel Narutowicz as President of the Republic in December 1922, Haller fell into disfavor. After the 1926 May Coup, he was ordered into retirement. He co-organized an opposition party, the "Front Morges".

At the time of the invasion of Poland (1939), Haller was living abroad. From 1940 to 1943 he served as Minister of Education in Władysław Sikorski's government. After 1945 he settled in London as an exile and did not take active part in any émigré Polish political activities.

== Early life ==
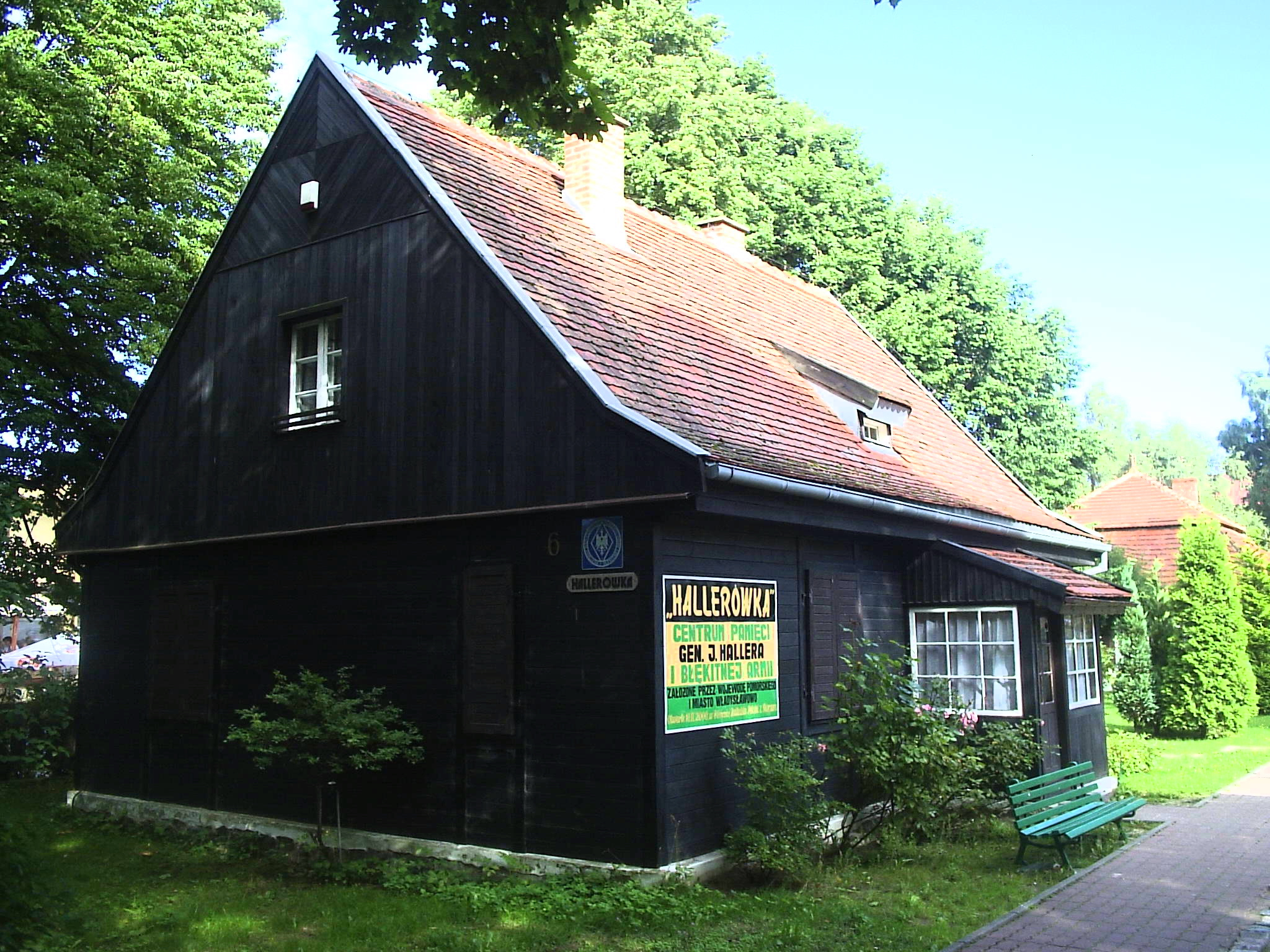
Józef Haller's house in Władysławowo

Haller was born 13 August 1873 in a small village called Jurczyce near Kraków (Skawina Municipal), in the Kingdom of Galicia and Lodomeria in the Austro-Hungarian Empire. Józef was the third child of a szlachta (Polish nobility) Henryk Haller and Olga Treter. One of his distant ancestors was Jan Haller, a bookseller and the owner of the first printing house in Poland in the 16th century. Józef Haller's father took part in the January Uprising against the partitioning powers and his maternal grandfather was a captain in the Polish Army during the November Uprising. He was also awarded the Virtuti Militari Knight's Cross.

Józef spent his early childhood in the countryside where up to the age of nine he grew up with his brothers and sisters. Like other family members, he belonged to the Catholic organizations such as Sodality of Our Lady (Sodalicja Mariańska), which popularized the veneration of the Virgin Mary, and the Third Secular Franciscan Order. Strong patriotism and religiousness were deeply rooted in Haller's family life and strongly influenced young Józef. Those family values – patriotism and religion – which shaped his personality, determined his future decisions.

In 1882 the Haller family moved to the city of Lwów, then under Austrian occupation, where Józef attended a local gymnasium. He subsequently continued his education in the military junior high school in Kaschau, Hungary (present-day Košice, Slovakia) and then in a high school in Hranice na Moravě (Weisskirchen) in Moravia, which was also attended to by some Austrian archdukes and European royalty. Afterwards, he studied at the Faculty of Artillery at Vienna's Theresian Military Academy.

== Austro-Hungarian Army ==
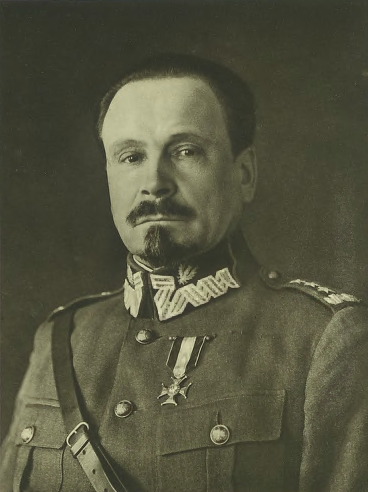
Haller in a Polish uniform

When Józef Haller graduated from the university he was designated the rank of Second Lieutenant and then started his 15-year-long service with the Austro-Hungarian Army. Between 1895 and 1910 he served with the 11th Artillery Regiment in Lviv. In 1903 Józef married Aleksandra Sala and in 1906 his son Eryk was born.

In 1910 Józef resigned from the Austro-Hungarian Army stating that "since he had reached the rank of captain and he is not able to learn anything new in the Austrian Artillery, he leaves the army in order to serve the country in some other way until his Homeland needs him."

== Social work ==
After dropping out of the army, Haller dedicated himself to social work. He was an active member of a farmers cooperative movement where he achieved remarkable successes. In 1912 he took up a post as the inspector in Farmer's Association (Towarzystwo Kółek Rolniczych). His duties included organizing agricultural, farm and dairy courses. He was also a member of the Scouting Movement and Polish Gymnastic Society "Falcon" (Sokół) which was founded in 1911. Some of his priorities there were to militarize "Falcon" and polonize the Scouting Movement and then transform it into "harcerstwo" which is a Polish equivalent of Scouting (the primary difference between most Scouting organizations and the Polish Harcerstwo was described by Andrzej Małkowski as Harcerstwo is Scouting plus independence).

Since mid 1912 Haller had worked as a military trainer: he set up Falcon teams, organized secret soldier, non-commissioned officer and officer courses for the Polish youth. In 1913 along with other colleagues he worked out model badges and terminology for "harcerstwo", many of which are still used today. He made a major contribution to creating the Scouts Cross where he suggested combining some elements of the Maltese Cross and the Polish Virtuti Militari Order.

== World War I ==
=== The Eastern Legion ===
When the Great War broke out it was a sign to mobilize Polish patriotic paramilitary organizations. On 27 August 1914, Józef Piłsudski issued an order in which he declared formation of the Polish Legions. On the strength of the order the Eastern Legion was formed in Lviv under the command of the General Adam Pietraszkiewicz. Haller was one of the founders of this formation which is a combination of Falcon's Drużyny Polowe (Fields Brigades), Bartosz Brigades and the Polskie Drużyny Strzeleckie (Polish Rifle Squads). At that time Austrian failures in Galicia led to occupation of Lviv and the whole territory of the eastern Galicia by the Russian army. The Legion had to withdraw into the surroundings of Mszana Dolna. Although the unit had been completely formed it did not participate in the battle. Due to a collapse of morale among soldiers and resistance against swearing loyalty to the Austrian emperor, the legion was disbanded.

=== Polish Legions ===
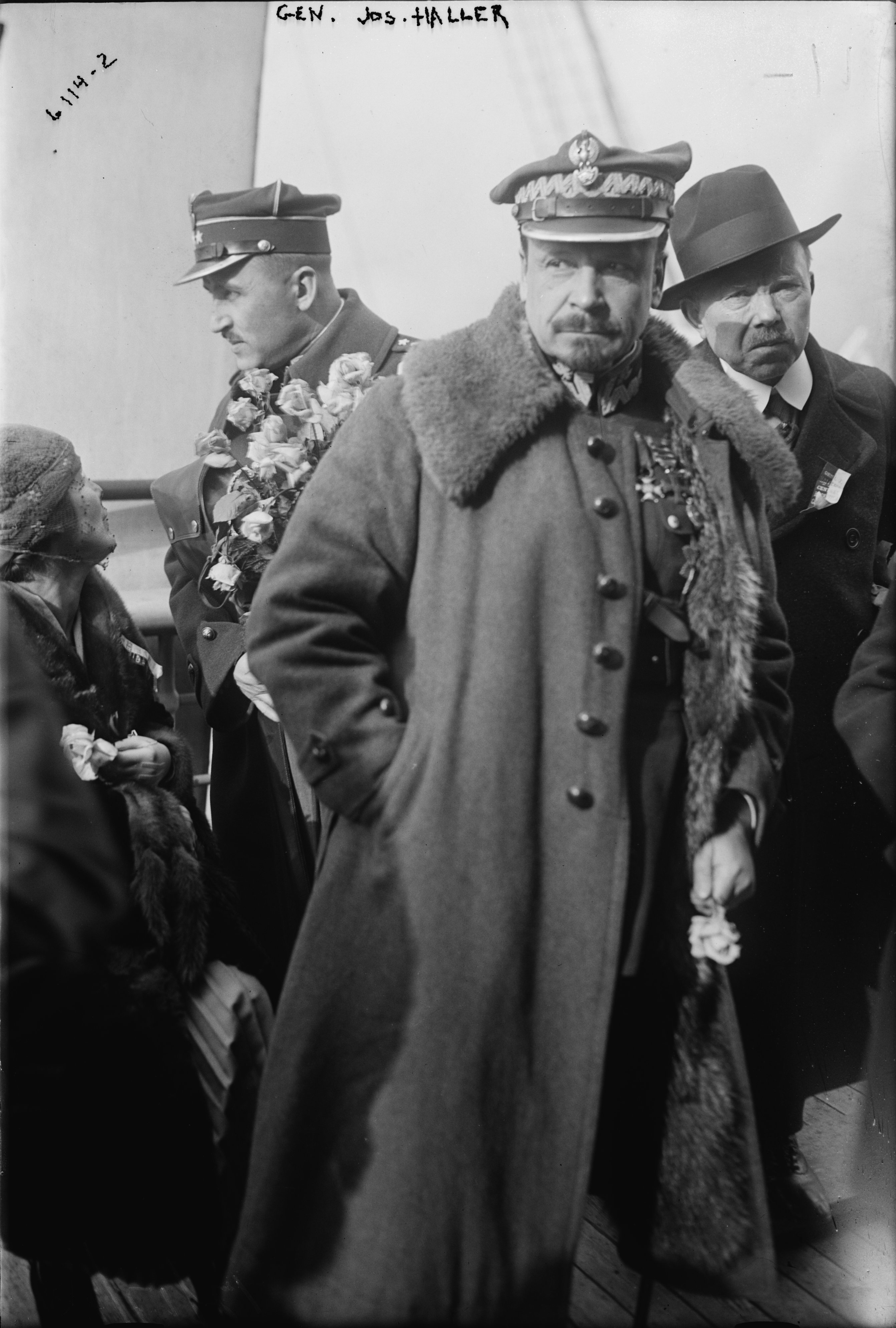
Józef Haller in an undated photo

Soldiers, who were in favor for continuing the war against the Russian Empire, were subjected to Joseph Haller's directions. He became the commander of the 3rd Legions' Infantry Regiment after its former reorganisation. He was then ranked lieutenant-colonel. On 30 September 1914, Haller and the military unit under his surveillance left Kraków, and set off to the front line in Eastern Carpathians. Despite bad climatic and topographic conditions, the brigade supported the defence of the Carpathians and hindered Russian access to Hungary.

In the beginning of October 1914, the brigade got to Hungarian side of Carpathians. On October 12 the 3rd Legions' Infantry Regiment troops under the command of Haller surmounted the Rafajlowa village in Galicia. On 22 and 23 October the main troops reached the village through the route near the Pantyr Mountain in Gorgany (later on it was named the Legions’ Mountain Pass), built by sappers and assaulted on Stanisławów. On 24 October the troops defeated Nadvirna. Five days later the Molotkow battle took place. The failure pushed Haller's soldiers back to Rafajlowa. In November the brigade was divided into two separate units. Haller's brigade remained in Rafajlowa, whereas the others continued the battle in Huculszczyzna and Bukovina.

On the night of 24 January 1915, Russians attacked the 3rd Legions' Infantry Regiment. Polish soldiers did not expect the offensive. However, due to their commander's actions, they defeated the enemy and took many Prisoners of War (POWs). A permanent struggle resulted in the loss of approximately 50% of soldiers. After the successful defence and stabilization on the front line, lieutenant colonel Haller passed the leadership of the 3rd Legions' Infantry Regiment to major Henryk Minkiewicz, simultaneously remaining in the 2nd Legions’ Infantry Brigade as commander's orderly officer. On 14 March 1915 he was promoted colonel.

On a temporary permit in Częstochowa, in May 1915 Haller was injured in a car accident. He spent 10 months recovering in a hospital. In spring of 1916 Haller became a member of the Colonels’ Council, which incorporated the heads of Legions’ military units, and functioned in opposition to Legions’ Headquarters, which advocated Austrian policy. In July 1918 Haller was given an assignment to command the 2nd Legions’ Infantry Brigade, which he accepted.

=== Polish Rifle Division ===
On 15 February 1918, Haller questioned the agreements of the Treaty of Brest-Litovsk which reduced the chances for the creation of an independent Poland,. Together with the II Brigade of the Polish Legions and the rest of Polish soldiers, Haller broke through the frontline near Rarańcza. and joined the Polish troops in Russia. He was ranked commander of a newly formed Polish 5th Siberian Rifle Division.

From 28 March 1918, he took charge of the military units of the Polish 2nd Corps in Ukraine. On 7 April 1918 Haller was appointed General. The legions under Haller's command were inspired by the National Democracy movement. Recruitment of Jewish volunteers to their ranks ceased in 1918, and the legions were later involved in pogroms.

=== Kaniów ===
Germany considered the presence of Polish military units in Ukraine an infringement of the Treaty of Brest-Litovsk. At midnight on 10–11 May 1918 German troops assaulted Polish units near Kaniv (Polish: Kaniów). There were no warnings preceding the attack. The battle continued for one day. After the ammunition storage expired, the Polish 2nd Corps surrendered. Many people were seriously injured. The Polish army lost less than 1000. the Germans close to 1500. Haller avoided imprisonment by faking his own death. Using the name "Mazowiecki" he fled to Moscow, where he became the head of Polish Army Commission.

=== France ===
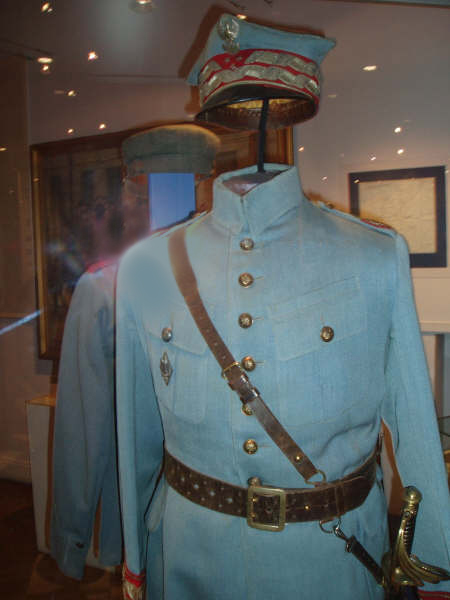
General Haller's uniform as Commander of the Blue Army (Military Museum, Warsaw)

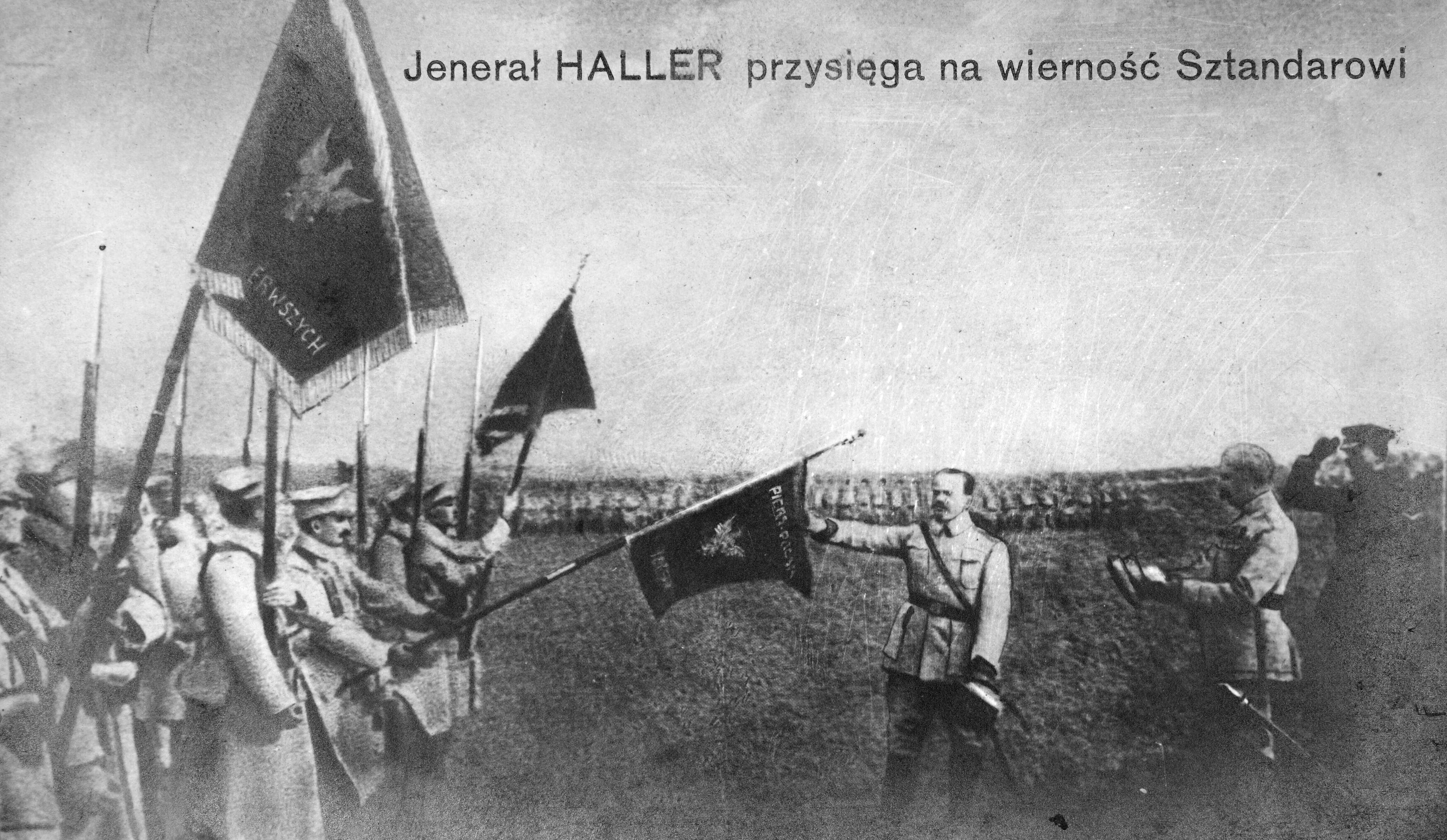
General Józef Haller, touching Blue Army battle flag.

In July 1918, after a long journey through East Karelia and Kola Peninsula to Murmansk, General Haller arrived in France. On 4 October 1918 he was designated to be in charge of the forming Polish Army. Those units were organised by volunteers. They consisted of Polish men who firstly served in the French army, former POWs of Austrian-Hungarian and German armies (nearly 35,000) and Polish emigrants from the United States and Canada (about 23,000 people) and Brazil (300 people). Political surveillance over the army was initially a domain of Polish National Committee. But according to an agreement of 28 September 1918, the Blue Army was recognised by the Triple Entente member countries and the independent Polish army.

In 1918 Polish troops commanded by Joseph Haller struggled with German soldiers on the western front line in the Vosges mountain region and Champagne.

=== Blue Army ===
The end of war did not interrupt the enlargement of the Polish army in France, also known as the Blue Army due to their uniforms. The number of soldiers was eventually over 100,000. Due to weapons supplied from France, the Polish Army finally became a significant military force. Beginning in April 1919, men and equipment were conveyed to Poland. Modern arms of the Blue Army, especially airplanes and Renault FT tanks enhanced the Polish Armed Forces yet to be founded. General Haller arrived in Warsaw on 21 April 1919, where he was welcomed as a national hero. He was granted honorary citizenship of Warsaw. The Blue Army was involved in anti-Jewish violence and its soldiers participated in pogroms.

== World War I aftermath ==
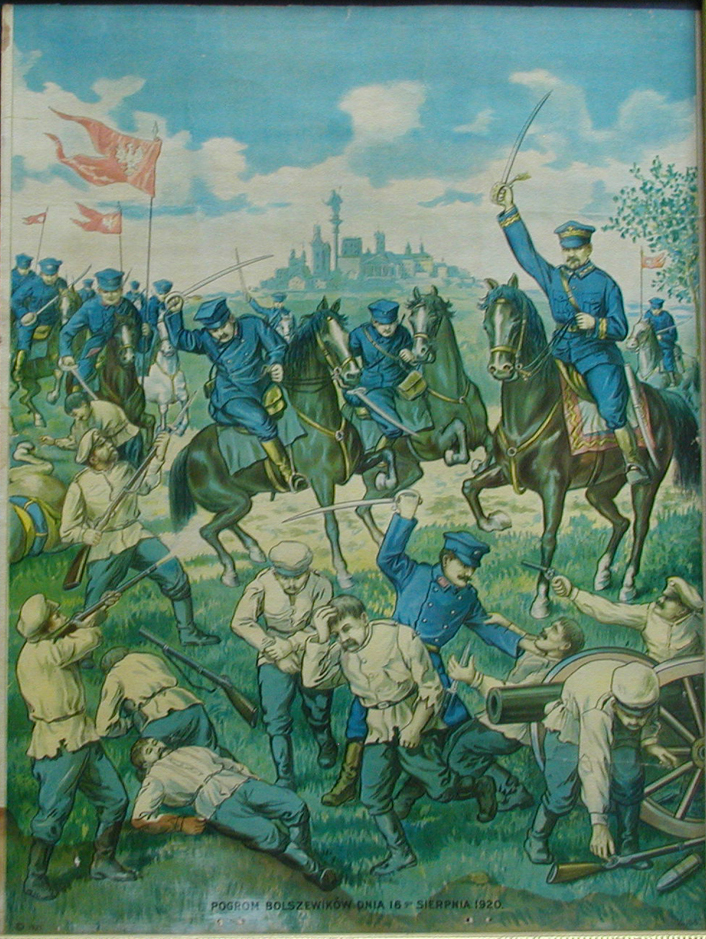
Blue Army under general Józef Haller von Hallenburg defending Warsaw in the Battle of Warsaw in Polish-Soviet War 1920.

=== Polish-Ukrainian War ===
Because the Blue Army was the only well-armed combat unit in the recreated Polish Army, the command decided not to split it into smaller pieces. The whole army was deployed at the Polish-Ukrainian frontline. In the course of victorious battles against the Ukrainian army, Haller's forces reached the Zbruch River, passing Volhynia and Eastern Galicia. However, in June the General himself was dispatched to the Polish-German borderline in order to take command of the army on the South-Western front.

=== Pomerania ===
As Venice so symbolized its marriage with the Adriatic so we Poles symbolize our marriage with our dear Baltic Sea.

— General Haller at the “Wedding to the Sea” ceremony in Putzig/Puck, 1920

In October 1919, Haller was entrusted with the command of the Pomeranian Front, created in order to claim the territory of Pomerania, in peaceful and planned way, as the territory was granted to Poland according to the Treaty of Versailles. As planned, the taking over of Pomerania began on 18 January 1920, starting with Toruń, which was taken over by squadrons of the 16th Pomeranian Infantry Division. More territories were taken from the retreating German Army, until 11 February 1920, when the last of the soldiers left Gdańsk (Danzig).

Despite a few incidents, including armed resistance and sabotage, the Pomeranian takeover proceeded rather easily. On 10 February 1920, General Haller together with the Minister of Internal Affairs, Stanisław Wojciechowski, and the new administration of the Pomeranian Province came to Puck, where he performed a "symbolic wedding ceremony" of Poland and the Baltic Sea.

=== Polish-Soviet War ===
In 1920 Haller was appointed Inspector General of the Volunteer Army, the formation to which he made a great contribution. During the Battle of Warsaw, he led the forces defending the capital's foregrounds. He was also a member of the Council for Defence of the Nation (July–August 1920) and later led the North-Eastern Front. At this stage of his career, he saw the end of the war.

== The interwar period ==
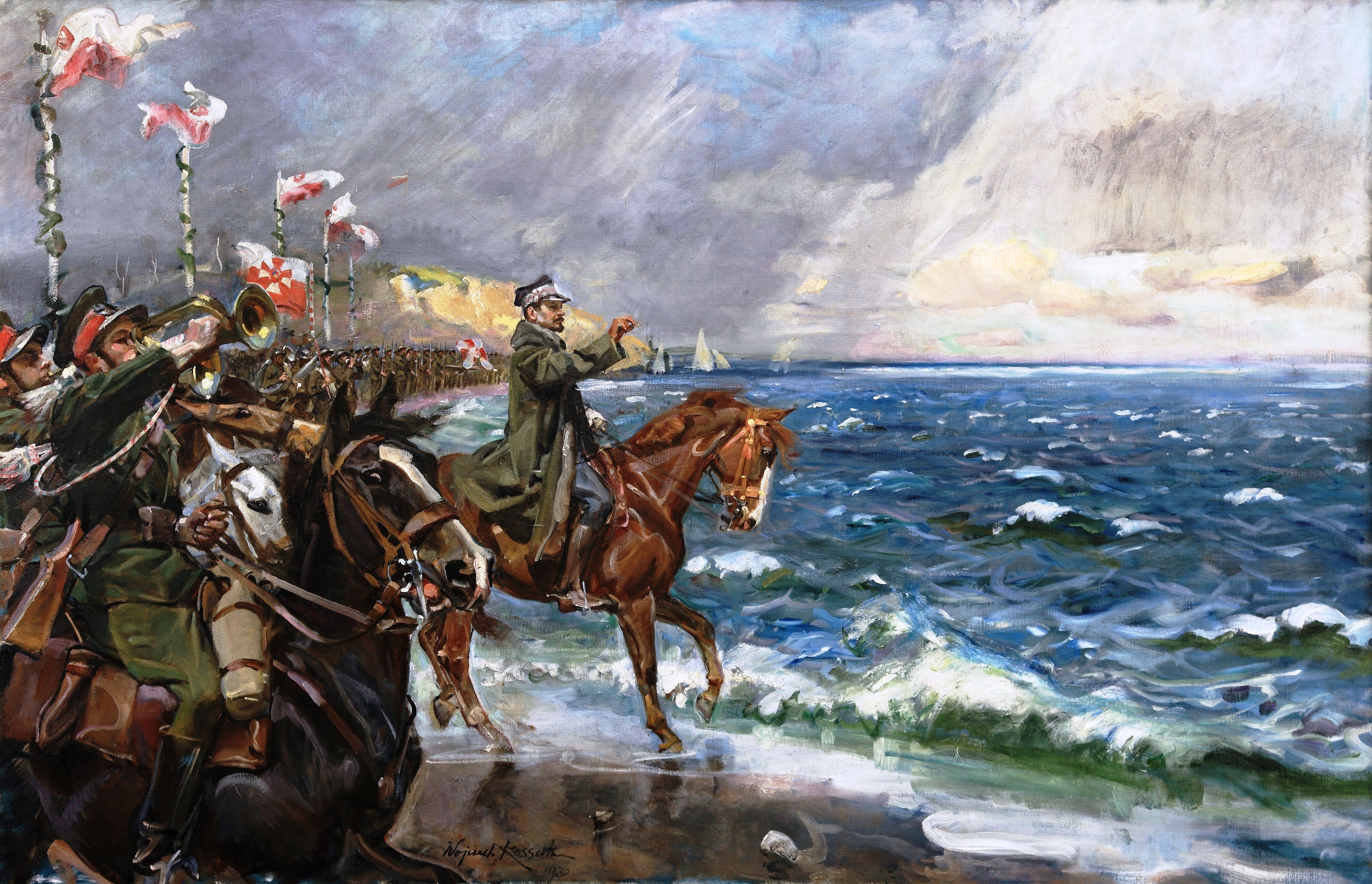
Painting Poland's Wedding to the Sea (1931) by Wojciech Kossak (1857–1942). General Haller throwing ceremonial ring to Baltic sea.

After the war, Józef Haller had inter alia function of the Inspector General of Artillery (in the years 1920–26), and the president of the Supreme Military Evaluation Commission. He was also a member of the War Council, lead the Hallerczyks’ Union, and from 3 July 1920 until 4 February 1923, was President of the Polish Scouting and Guiding Association. During the years 1922–27 he was a member of the Sejm, of the Christian Union of National Unity Party. Because of his nationalist views, he was considered, among others, one of those who were responsible for the anti-Semitic riots in Częstochowa in 1919 in which soldiers of the Blue Army took part. He was also said to be responsible for inspiring an atmosphere of hostility towards president Gabriel Narutowicz, claiming that he had been elected with "non-Polish" votes; Narutowicz would be assassinated days after his election.

In 1923 and again in 1933, the General traveled to the United States with a mission of support for veterans and disabled members of the Blue Army. Among the sites General Haller visited in 1923 was St. Hyacinth Basilica in Chicago's Polish Village, taking part in the dedication service of a monument dedicated to the Blue Army that still stands in the "Garden of Memory" next to the Basilica to the present day.

General Haller condemned Piłsudski's May Coup d'État which resulted in him being retired on 31 July 1926. In the 1920s along with his wife Alexandra and his son Eryk he settled in Pomerania in the Gorzuchowo mansion, near Chełmno. During the years 1936–39, he was one of the organizers and leaders of Front Morges which was in opposition to the government of the sanacja regime. On 10 October 1937, on the Labor Party's Constitutional Congress he was elected the head of the party's Principal Board.

== World War II ==
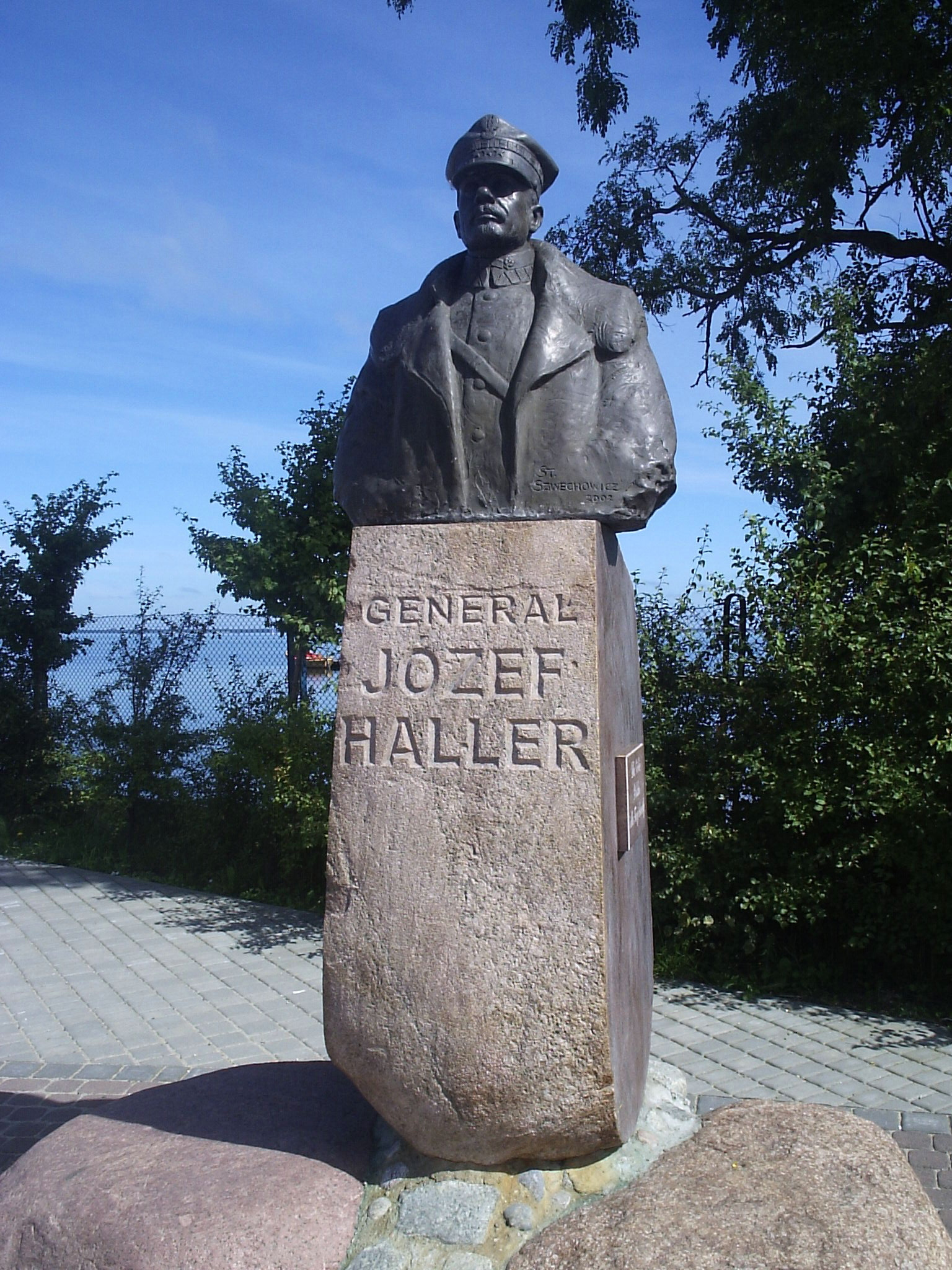
Memorial of Gen. Józef Haller in Puck, Poland

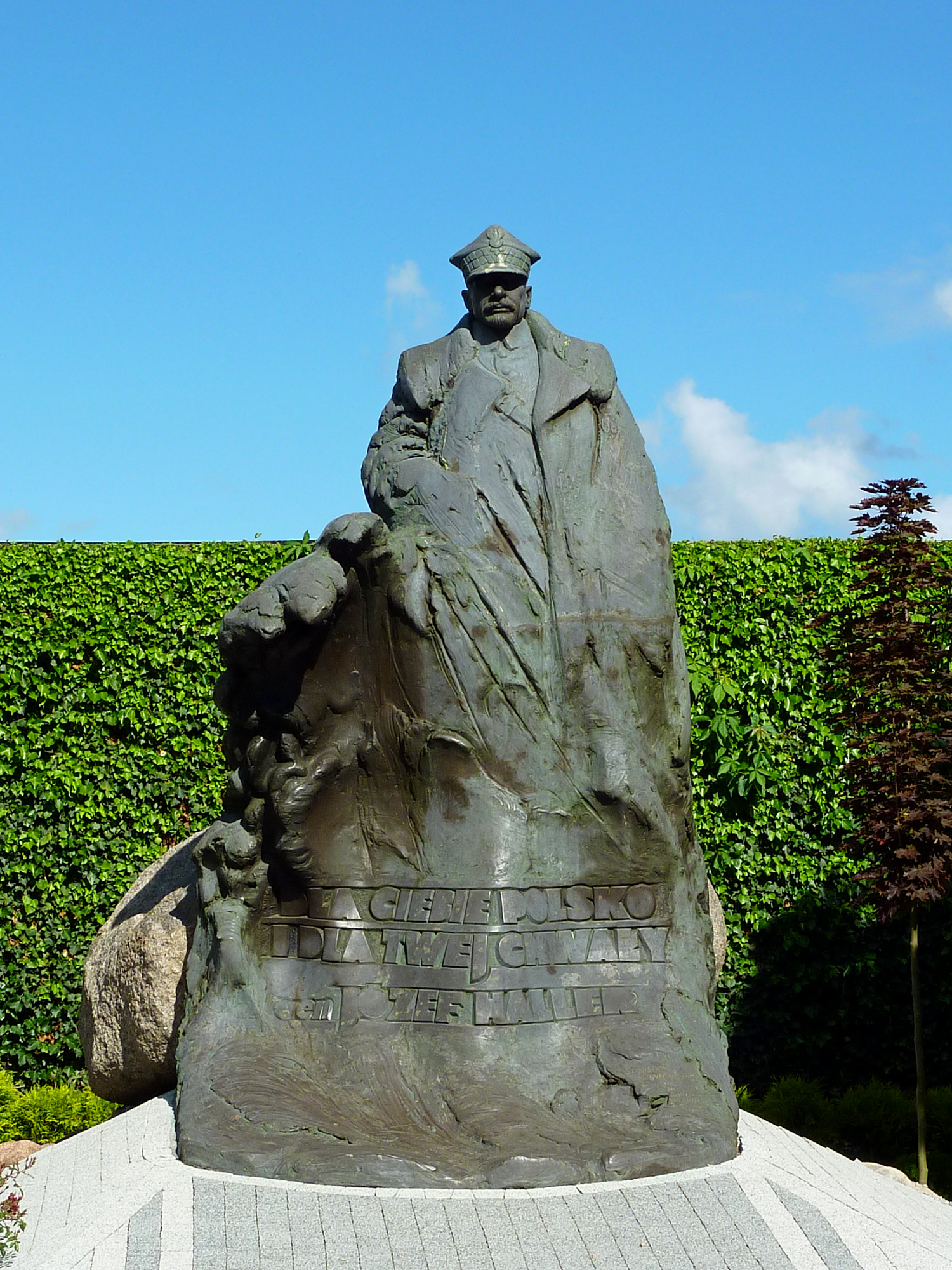
Józef Haller monument in Władysławowo, Poland

Haller coat of arms

After World War II broke out, Haller managed to make his way through Romania, to France, where he offered himself to serve General Władysław Sikorski's government, which was about to be formed. He also led the Intergovernmental Committee for Registration. On the first days of November 1939 he entered the government as a Minister without Portfolio. At the turn of the years 1939–1940, he travelled again to the US, but this time to encourage American Polonia to join the Polish Army, which was being formed in France.

After the fall of the government in France, Haller reached Great Britain, through Spain and Portugal. In Great Britain during the years 1940–1943, he was a Minister of Education in the Polish Government-in-Exile.

== Postwar ==
After the war Józef Haller decided to remain abroad and settled in London for good, where, steeped in the legend of the "Blue General", he died on 4 June 1960 at the age of 86. He was buried in the Gunnersbury cemetery. Thanks to the initiative of the Polish Scouts from "Whites" team, his ashes were returned to Poland on 23 April 1993 and are now kept in a crypt in St. Agnes’ garrison church in Kraków.

== Promotions ==
- Captain of Artillery – 1909
- Captain of Infantry – 18 October 1914
- Major of Infantry – 25 October 1914
- Lieutenant Colonel of Infantry – 20 November 1914
- Colonel of Infantry – 14 March 1915
- Brigadier – 7 April 1918
- Major General – 29 November 1918
- Lieutenant General – 10 June 1920

== Honours and awards ==
- Knight of the Order of the White Eagle
- Silver Cross of the Order of Virtuti Militari
- Commander's Cross of the Order of Polonia Restituta
- Cross of Valour, four times
- Legion of Honour, Class II (France)
- Croix de guerre (France)
- Scouts Cross
- Order of Malta
- Order of St. Stanislaus
- Order of Leopold (Austria)
- Order of Vasa
- Military Merit Medal (Austria-Hungary)
- Grand Officer of the Order of the Crown of Italy
- Freedom Cross Second Class (Estonia)

== Legacy ==
After World War I, the Warsaw chapter of the Order of Haller's Swords was formed to commemorate the wartime service of individuals who aided in the Polish independence movement. The organization conferred Haller's Swords, a decoration featuring the Polish eagle and crossed swords, on a number of Polish soldiers and several Allies. Recipients included:

- Clarence Ransom Edwards
- Laurence Hawley Watres
- Grover Whalen

== See also ==
- The Blue Army
- Poland's Wedding to the Sea
- Stanisław Haller de Hallenburg

== Bibliography ==
- W. Lipiński, Walka zbrojna o niepodległość Polski w latach 1905–1918, Warszawa, 1990 (in Polish)
- J. Haller, Pamiętniki. Z wyborem dokumentów i zdjęć, Londyn 1964 (in Polish)
- H. Przybyłowski, Chrześcijańska Demokracja i Narodowa Partia Robotnicza w latach 1926–1937, Warszawa 1980 (in Polish)
- O. Terlecki, Generał Sikorski, t. 1, Kraków 1986 (in Polish)
- Władze RP na obczyźnie podczas II wojny światowej, pod red. Z. Błażyńskiego, Londyn 1994 (in Polish)
- T. Kryska-Karski, S. Żurakowski, Generałowie Polski Niepodległej, Warszawa 1991 (in Polish)
- S. Czerep, II Brygada Legionów Polskich, Warszawa 1991 (in Polish)
- I. Modelski, Dlaczego podczas II wojny światowej nie powstała Armia Polska w Ameryce?, (w:) "Komunikaty Towarzystwa im. Romana Dmowskiego", t. II, cz. 1, Londyn 1979/1980 (in Polish)
- Paul Valasek, Haller's Polish Army in France, Chicago 2006 English
