= Zawady, Wołomin County =

Zawady
- Village
- Location within Poland
- Coordinates: 52°26′48″N 21°12′59″E
- Country: Poland
- Voivodeship: Masovian
- County: Wołomin
- Gmina: Radzymin
- Population (approx.): 240

Zawady [zaˈvadɨ] is a village in the administrative district of Gmina Radzymin, within Wołomin County, Masovian Voivodeship, in east-central Poland.
