= Stary Dybów =

- Village
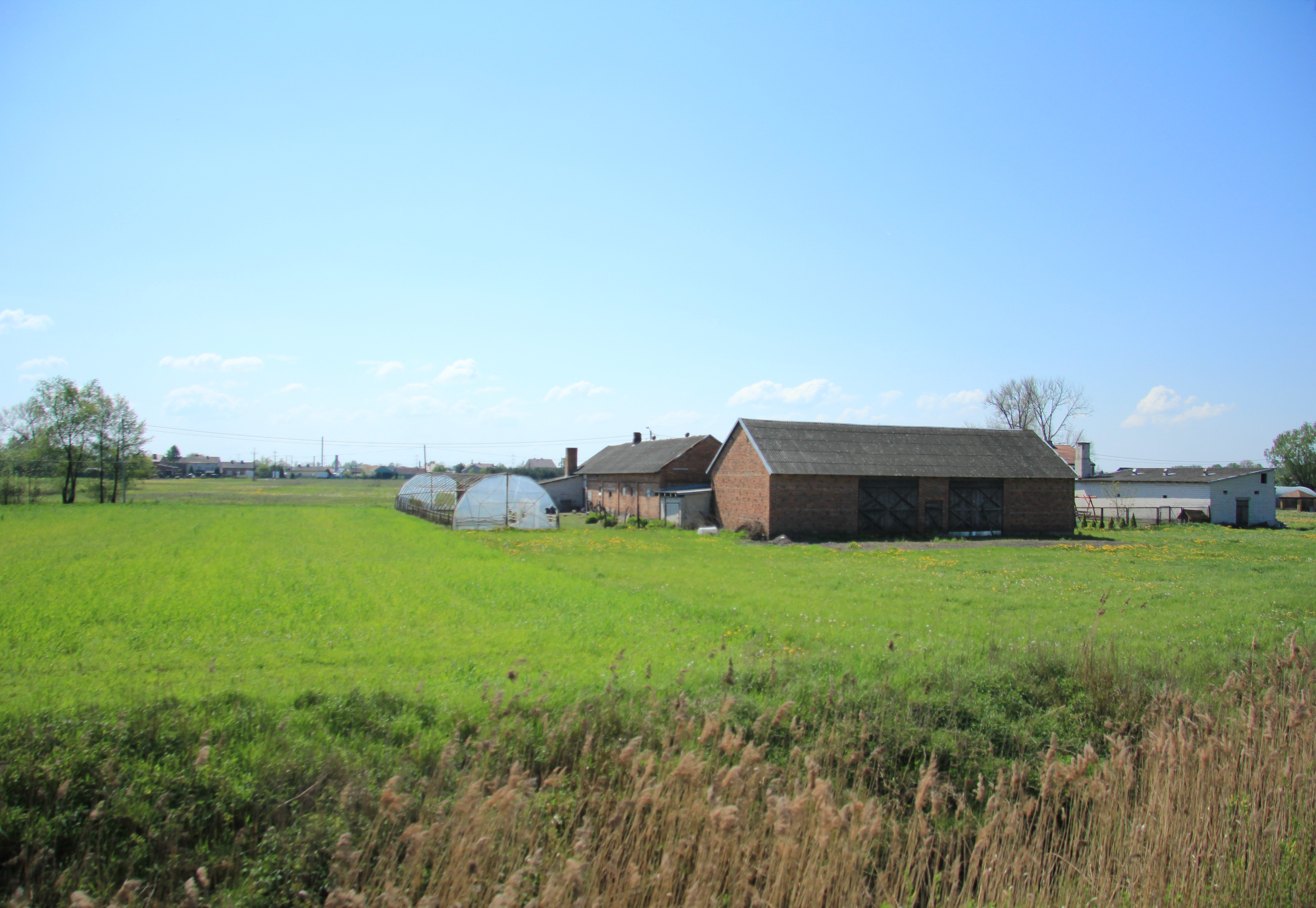

- Location within Poland
- Coordinates: 52°25′43″N 21°13′10″E
- Country: Poland
- Voivodeship: Masovian
- County: Wołomin
- Gmina: Radzymin
- Population: 410

Stary Dybów [ˈstarɨ ˈdɨbuf] is a village in the administrative district of Gmina Radzymin, within Wołomin County, Masovian Voivodeship, in east-central Poland.
