= Yueliang Road station =

Shenzhen Metro Line 13 station

Yueliang Road 月亮路
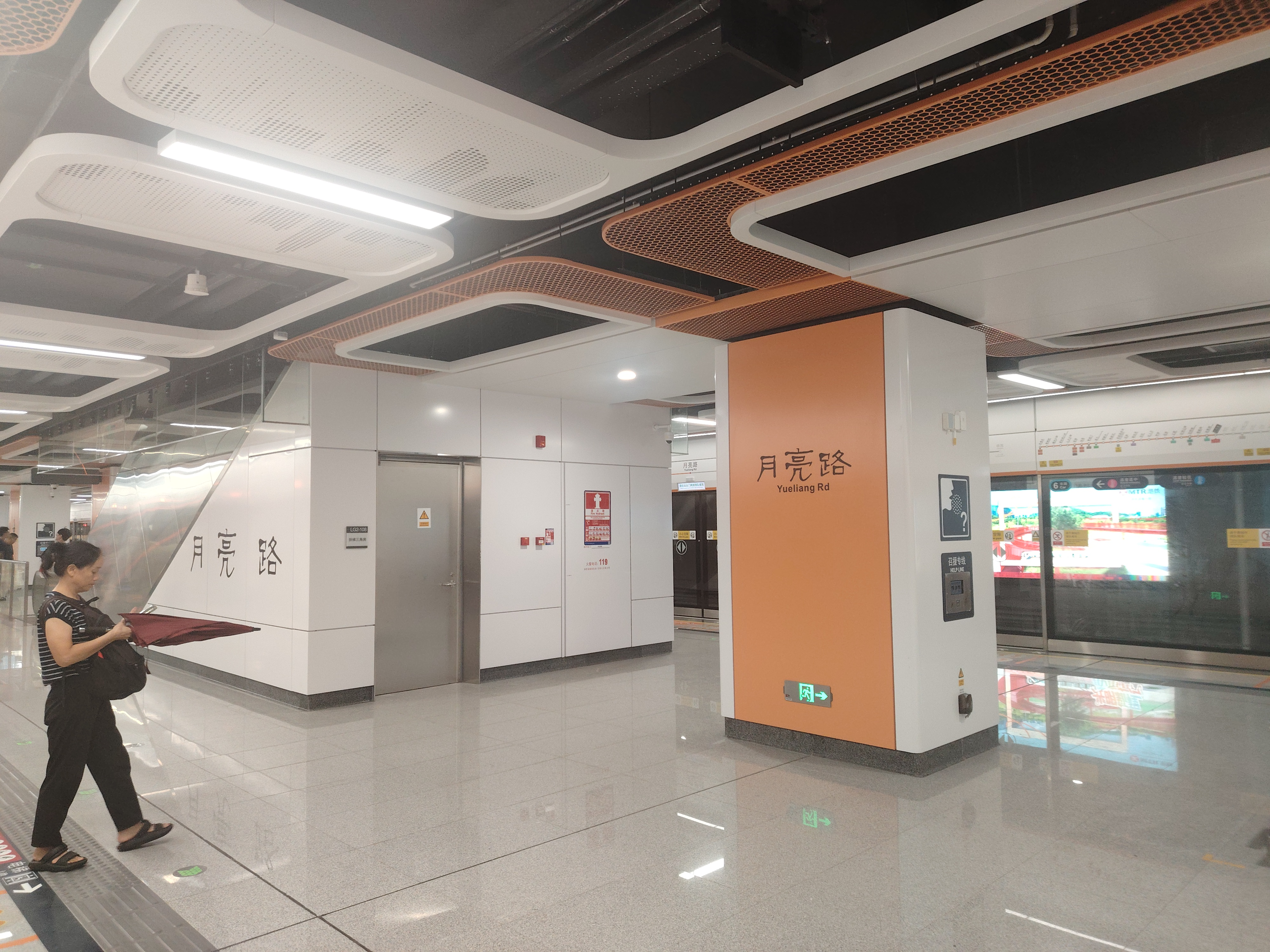
- Platform

Chinese name
- Chinese: 月亮路
Transcriptions
Standard Mandarin
- Hanyu Pinyin: Yuèliàng Lù
Yue: Cantonese
- Yale Romanization: Yuhtleuhng Lǒu
- Jyutping: jyut6 loeng6 lou6

General information
- Location: Tanghong Road (塘宏路), between Yueliang Road (月亮路) and Yiju 1st Road (宜居一路); Fenghuang Subdistrict, Guangming District, Shenzhen, Guangdong; China
- Coordinates: 22°44′58.1″N 113°54′21.9″E
- Operated by: MTR China Railway Electrification Rail Transit (Shenzhen) Co., Ltd (MTR Rail Transit (Shenzhen) Co., Ltd. and China Railway Electrification Bureau Group Co., Ltd.)
- Line: Line 13
- Platforms: 2 (1 island platform)
- Tracks: 2

Construction
- Structure type: Underground
- Accessible: Yes

History
- Opened: 28 June 2026 (21 days ago)

Services
Preceding station	Shenzhen Metro	Following station
Fenghuang Town towards Shenzhen Bay Checkpoint	Line 13	Jiangwei towards Lisonglang
Location

Yueliang Road station (Chinese: 月亮路站; pinyin: Yuèliàng Lù Zhàn; Cantonese Yale: Yuhtleuhng Lǒu Jaahm) is a station on Line 13 of Shenzhen Metro. It opened on 28 June 2026, and is located in Fenghuang Subdistrict in Guangming District.

== Station layout ==
The station is a two-level underground island platform station constructed using the cut-and-cover method.

The station is one of the four distinctive stations on the Line 13 Phase II northern extension. Its design theme incorporates perforated patterns reminiscent of Shenzhen's skyline. The art wall uses colorful mosaic tiles to wrap the pillars, creating an abstract interplay of starlight and moonlight, reflecting the synergy between industrial vitality and innovative brilliance.

G	-	Exits A-D
B1F; Concourse	Lobby	Ticket Machines, Customer Service, Shops, Station Control Room
B2F; Platforms	Platform 1	13 towards Shenzhen Bay Checkpoint (Fenghuang Town)
B2F; Platforms	Island platform, doors will open on the left
B2F; Platforms	Platform 2	13 towards Lisonglang (Jiangwei)

=== Entrances/exits ===
The station has 4 points of entry/exit. Exits A and C are equipped with elevators. Exit B is still under construction.

- : Yueliang Road, Tangrong Road, Majiaoling Road
- : (under construction)
- : Yiju 1st Road, Tanghong Road, Dongming Avenue, Tangzhen Road
- : Yueliang Road, Dongming Avenue, Dongchang Road

== History ==
- In April 2022, the left track of the section between Yueliang Road and Dongzhou Road (now Jiangwei) stations was completed.
- In April 2024, the naming convention for the station as Yueliang Road station in the "Shenzhen Rail Transit Phase IV Adjustment Project" issued by the Shenzhen Municipal Planning and Natural Resources Bureau was approved.
