= Jiangwei station =

Shenzhen Metro Line 13 station

Jiangwei 将围
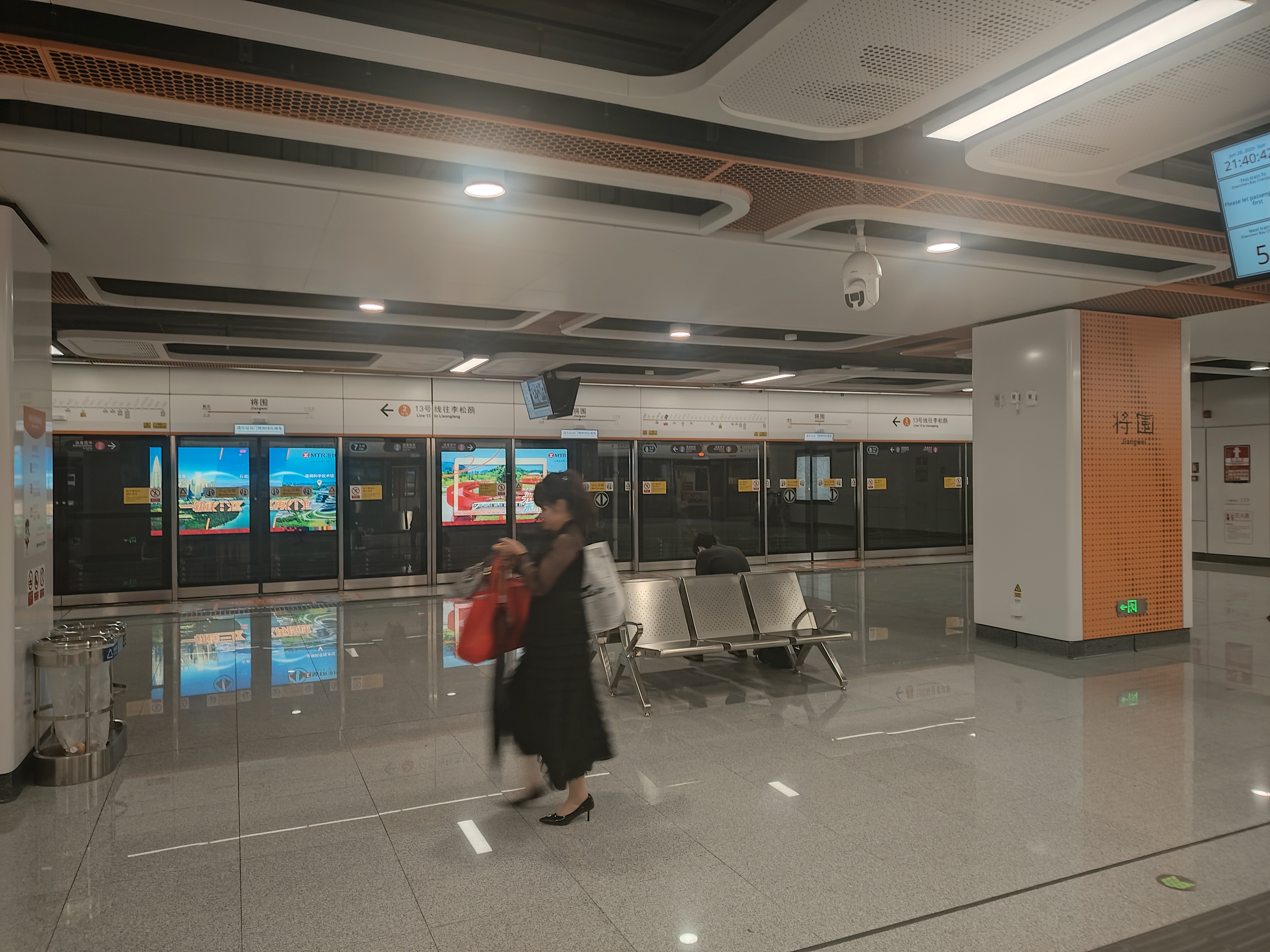
- Platform

Chinese name
- Simplified Chinese: 将围
- Traditional Chinese: 將圍
Transcriptions
Standard Mandarin
- Hanyu Pinyin: Jiāngwéi
Yue: Cantonese
- Yale Romanization: Jēungwài
- Jyutping: zoeng1 wai4

General information
- Location: Intersection of Songbai Road (松白路) and Jiangshi Road (将石路); Boundary of Fenghuang Subdistrict and Matian Subdistrict, Guangming District, Shenzhen, Guangdong; China
- Coordinates: 22°45′36.3″N 113°54′3.1″E
- Operated by: MTR China Railway Electrification Rail Transit (Shenzhen) Co., Ltd (MTR Rail Transit (Shenzhen) Co., Ltd. and China Railway Electrification Bureau Group Co., Ltd.)
- Line: Line 13
- Platforms: 2 (1 island platform)
- Tracks: 2

Construction
- Structure type: Underground
- Accessible: Yes

History
- Opened: 28 June 2026 (21 days ago)
- Previous names: Dongzhou Road (东周路)

Services
Preceding station	Shenzhen Metro	Following station
Yueliang Road towards Shenzhen Bay Checkpoint	Line 13	Xinzhuang towards Lisonglang
Location

Jiangwei station (Chinese: 将围站; pinyin: Jiāngwéi Zhàn; Cantonese Yale: Jēungwài Jaahm) is a station on Line 13 of Shenzhen Metro. It opened on 28 June 2026, and is located at the boundary of Fenghuang Subdistrict and Matian Subdistrict in Guangming District.

== Station layout ==
The station is a two-level underground island platform station.

G	-	Exits A-F
B1F; Concourse	Lobby	Ticket Machines, Customer Service, Shops, Station Control Room
B2F; Platforms	Platform 1	13 towards Shenzhen Bay Checkpoint (Yueliang Road)
B2F; Platforms	Island platform, doors will open on the left
B2F; Platforms	Platform 2	13 towards Lisonglang (Xinzhuang)

=== Entrances/exits ===
The station has 6 points of entry/exit.

- : Songbai Road, Jiangwei New Village, Gongming Dongsheng Road, Guangming District Experimental School
- : Songbai Road, Zhoujia Avenue, Jiangwei New Village
- : Songbai Road, Dawei Village, Jiangshi Community, Guangming District Longhao Primary School
- : Songbai Road, Zhoujia Avenue, Jiangwei Logistics Park, Jingu Power Technology Park
- : Songbai Road, Zhoujia Avenue, Yufeng Industrial Park, Zhili Technical School
- : Songbai Road, Dongzhou Road, Shiwei Village

== History ==
During construction, the station was called Dongzhou Road station, and it topped out on 22 September 2022.

In April 2024, the naming convention for the station as Jiangwei station in the "Shenzhen Rail Transit Phase IV Adjustment Project" issued by the Shenzhen Municipal Planning and Natural Resources Bureau was approved. Even though the station location straddles on the boundary between the Fenghuang and Matian subdistricts, the prominent community towards the southwest of the station, Jiangwei Community, is situated in Matian subdistrict, and thus its name was used. "Jiangwei," formerly known as "Jiangjunwei," was a walled village built during the Chenghua period of the Ming Dynasty. It was named after the Mai family, who settled here and produced five military officers during the Qing Dynasty.

The station opened as part of Line 13 Phase II northern extension on 28 June 2026.
