= Xinzhuang station (Shenzhen Metro) =

Shenzhen Metro Line 13 station

Xinzhuang 新庄
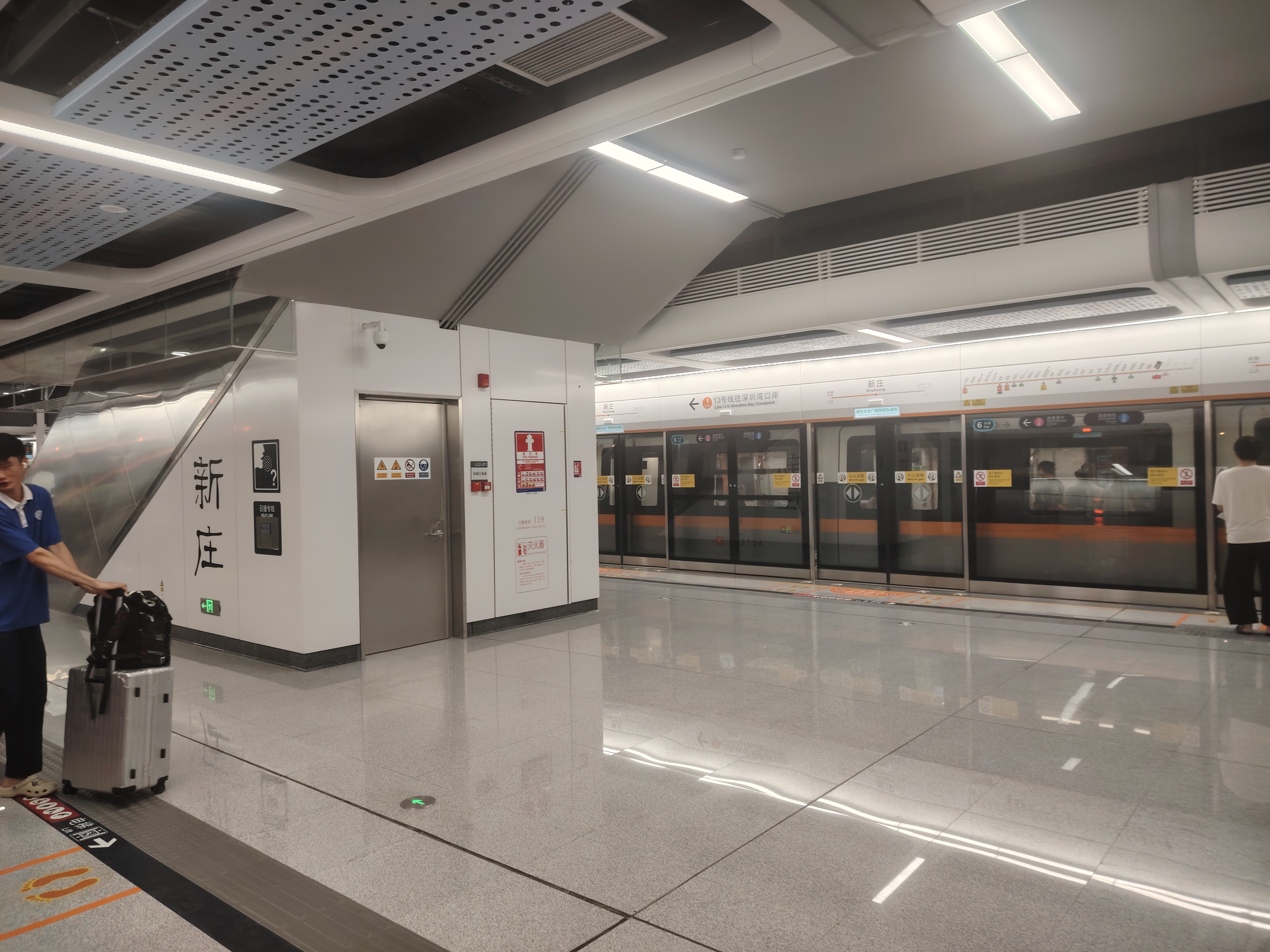
- Platform

Chinese name
- Simplified Chinese: 新庄
- Traditional Chinese: 新莊
Transcriptions
Standard Mandarin
- Hanyu Pinyin: Xīnzhuāng
Yue: Cantonese
- Yale Romanization: Sānjōng
- Jyutping: san1 zong1

General information
- Location: South side of intersection of Songbai Road (松白路), Gongming East Ring Avenue (公明东环大道) and Gongming South Ring Avenue (公明南环大道); Matian Subdistrict, Guangming District, Shenzhen, Guangdong; China
- Coordinates: 22°46′8″N 113°53′53″E
- Operated by: MTR China Railway Electrification Rail Transit (Shenzhen) Co., Ltd (MTR Rail Transit (Shenzhen) Co., Ltd. and China Railway Electrification Bureau Group Co., Ltd.)
- Line: Line 13
- Platforms: 2 (1 island platform)
- Tracks: 2

Construction
- Structure type: Underground
- Accessible: Yes

History
- Opened: 28 June 2026 (21 days ago)
- Previous names: Gongming South (公明南)

Services
| Preceding station | Shenzhen Metro | Following station |
|---|---|---|
| Jiangwei towards Shenzhen Bay Checkpoint | Line 13 | Gongming Square towards Lisonglang |
Location

Xinzhuang station (Chinese: 新庄站; pinyin: Xīnzhuāng Zhàn; Cantonese Yale: Sānjōng Jaahm) is a station on Line 13 of Shenzhen Metro. It opened on 28 June 2026, and is located in Matian Subdistrict in Guangming District.

== Station layout ==
The station is a two-level underground island platform station. The main structure is a column-free arch structure cast as a single integral cast with a span of 20.9m, making it the only station of this type on the Line 13 Phase II northern extension. The central ceiling of the concourse features a blue-purple starry-sky aluminum panel paired with twinkling LED lights to simulate the vast Milky Way, offering a view of the starry sky.

| G | - | Exits A-E |
| B1F; Concourse | Lobby | Ticket Machines, Customer Service, Shops, Station Control Room |
| B2F; Platforms | Platform 1 | 13 towards Shenzhen Bay Checkpoint (Jiangwei) |
| B2F; Platforms | Island platform, doors will open on the left |
| B2F; Platforms | Platform 2 | 13 towards Lisonglang (Gongming Square) |

=== Gallery ===
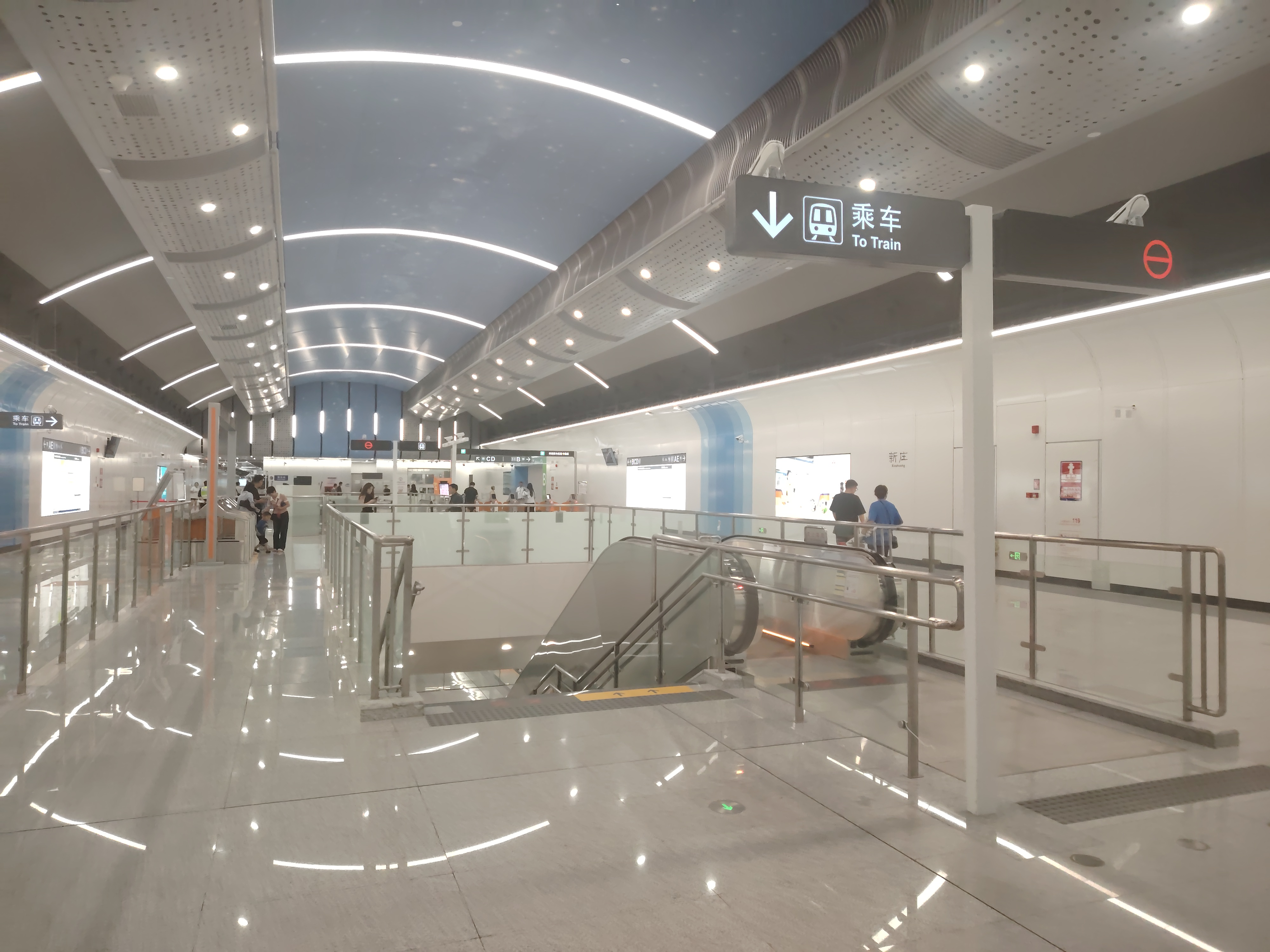
Concourse

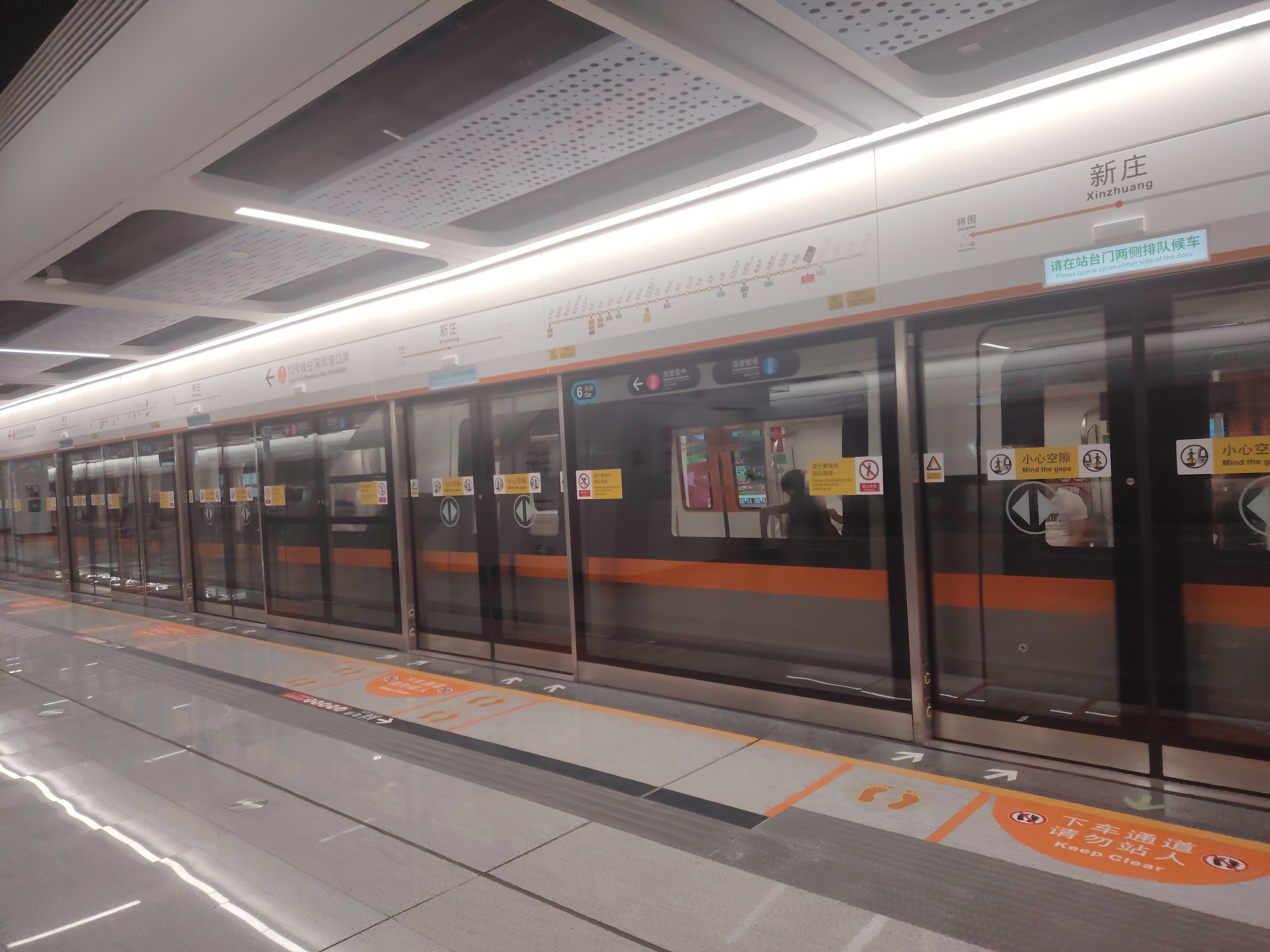
Platform 1

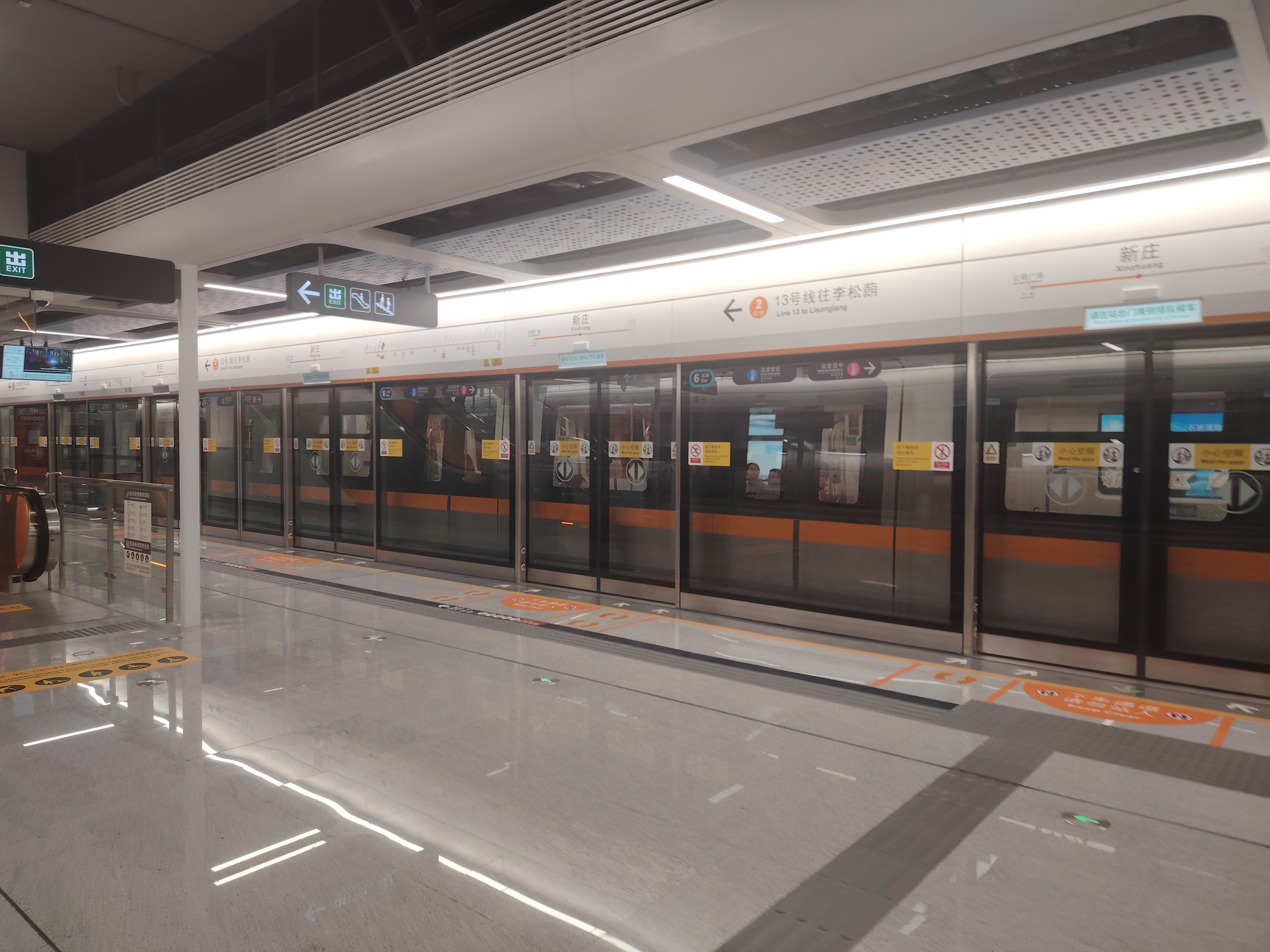
Platform 2

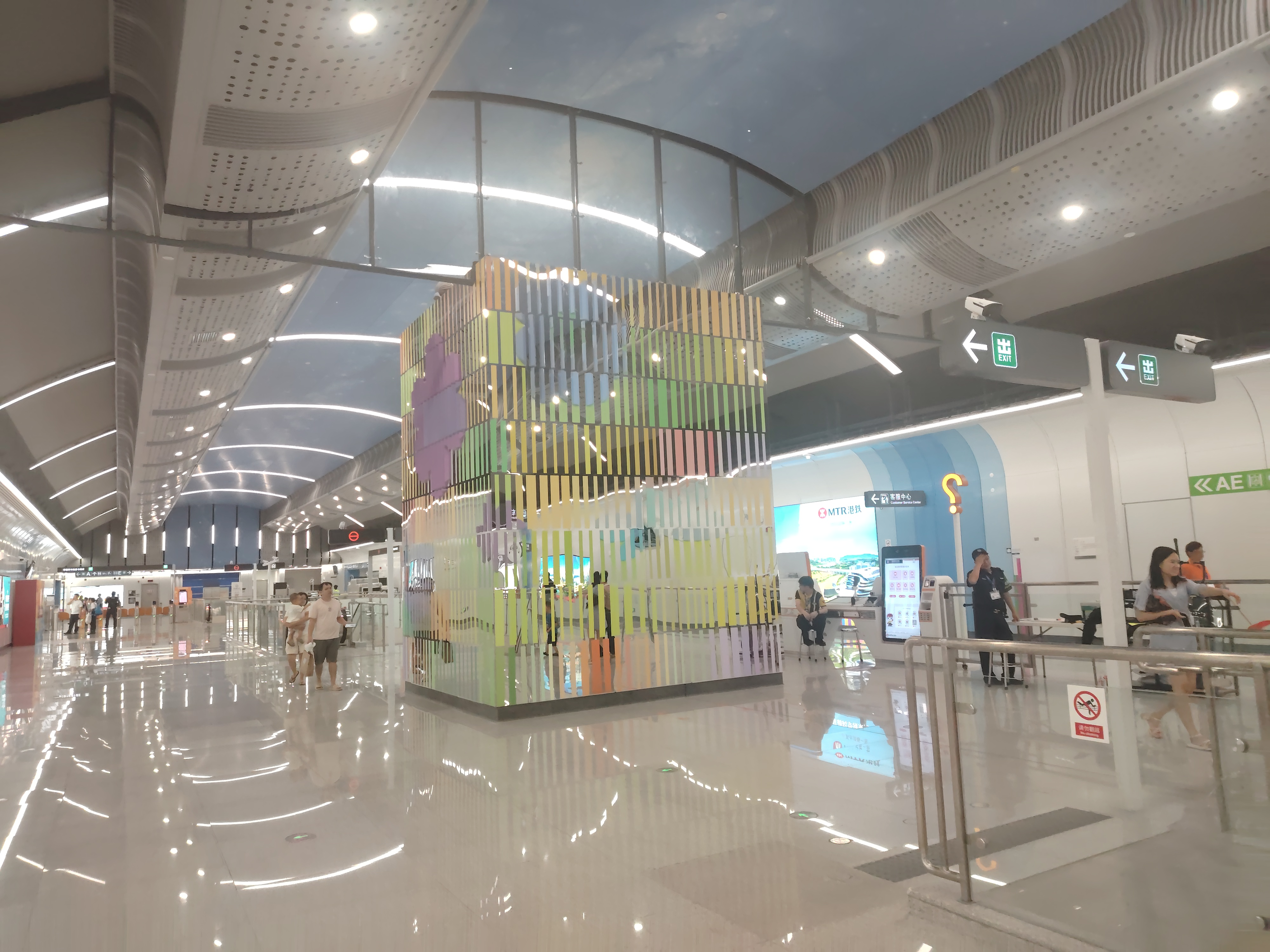
Art wall

=== Entrances/exits ===
The station has 8 points of entry/exit. Exits B1 and E2 are equipped with elevators. Exit A has a toilet.

- : Songbai Road, Taiyang Road, Guangming District Senior High School, Guangming District Longhao Primary School, Xinwei New Village
- : Songbai Road, Gongming East Ring Avenue, Guangming District Senior High School, Yitian Holiday Residence
- : Songbai Road, Gongming East Ring Avenue, Gongming Traffic Police Squadron, Nanzhuang Old Village, Dadongming City Plaza
- : Songbai Road, Gongming South Ring Avenue, Jintian Electronics Shenzhen Factory, Xiashijia Village
- : Songbai Road, Xiashijia Road, Shenzhen University of Technology General Hospital (West Campus), Jiangshi New Village, Guangming District Fire and Rescue Brigade
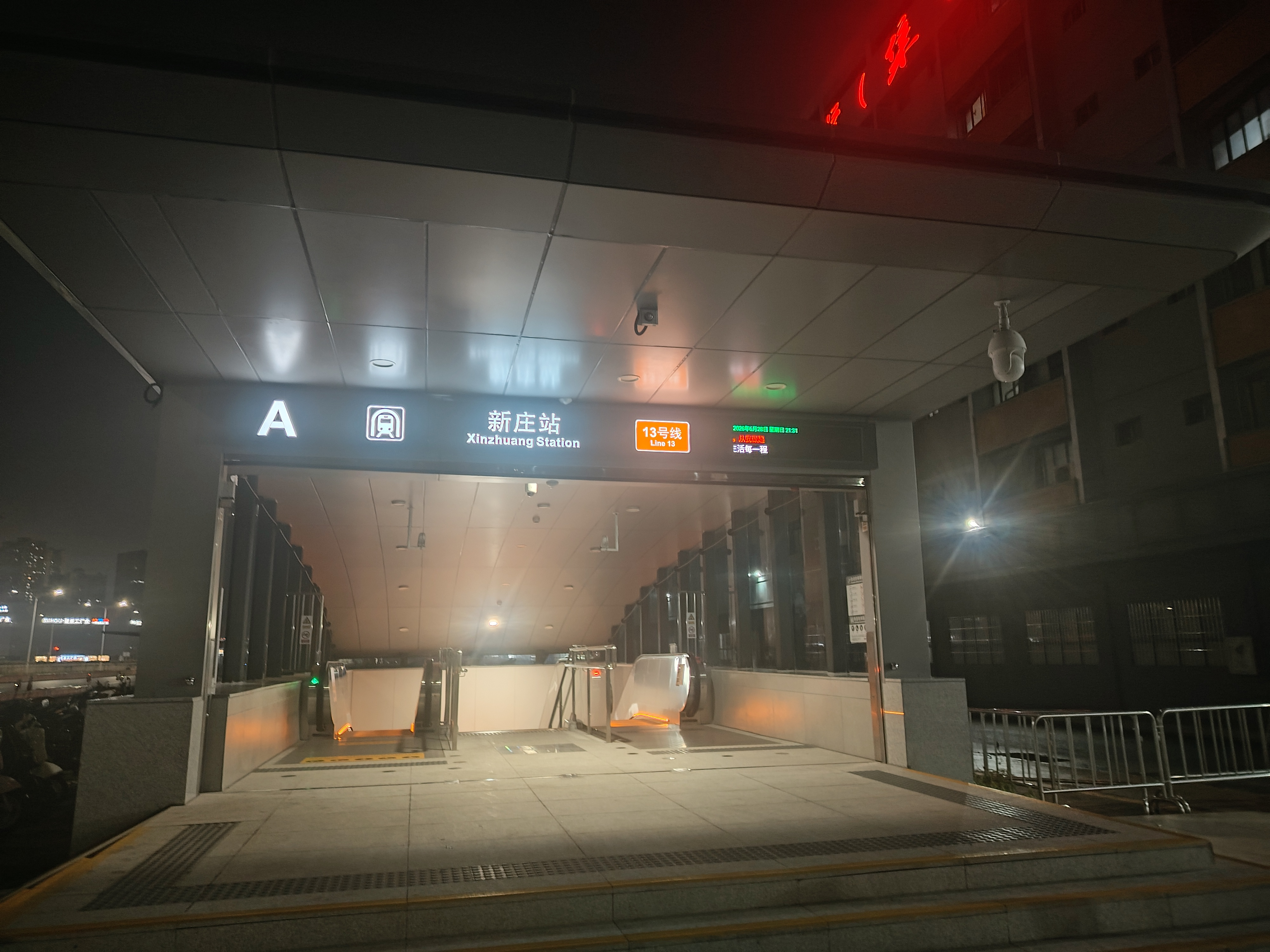
Entrance A

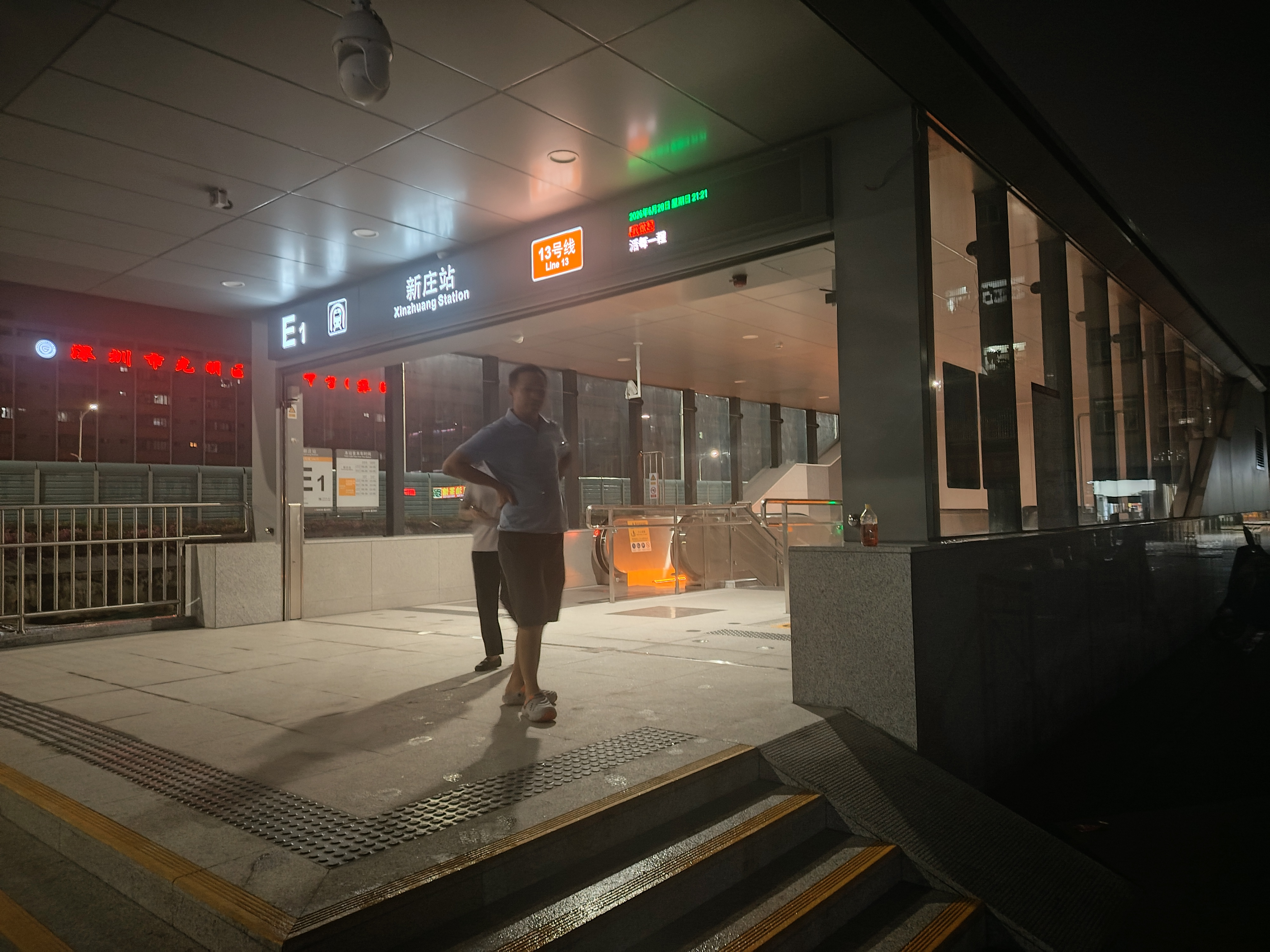
Entrance E1

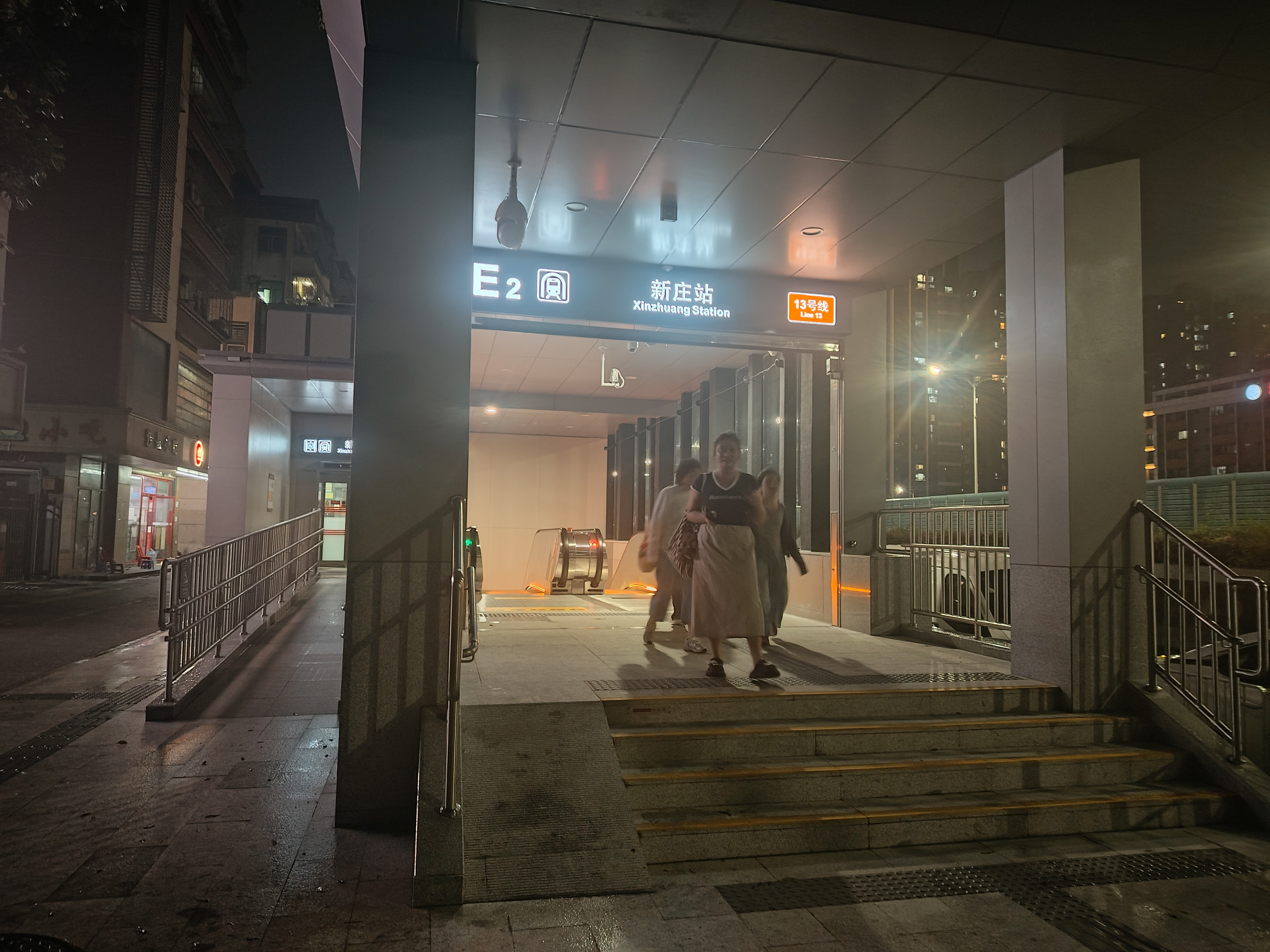
Entrance E2

== History ==
During construction, the station was called Gongming South station. The first phase of traffic diversion was completed on 21 June 2021, and the station topped out in November 2022. The tunnels leading in and out of the station broke through on 9 May 2023.

In April 2024, the naming convention for the station as Xinzhuang station in the "Shenzhen Rail Transit Phase IV Adjustment Project" issued by the Shenzhen Municipal Planning and Natural Resources Bureau was approved. The name was based on the Xinzhuang Community to the southeast of the station.

The station opened as part of Line 13 Phase II northern extension on 28 June 2026.
