= Deya Road station =

Shenzhen Metro Line 13 station

Deya Road 德雅路
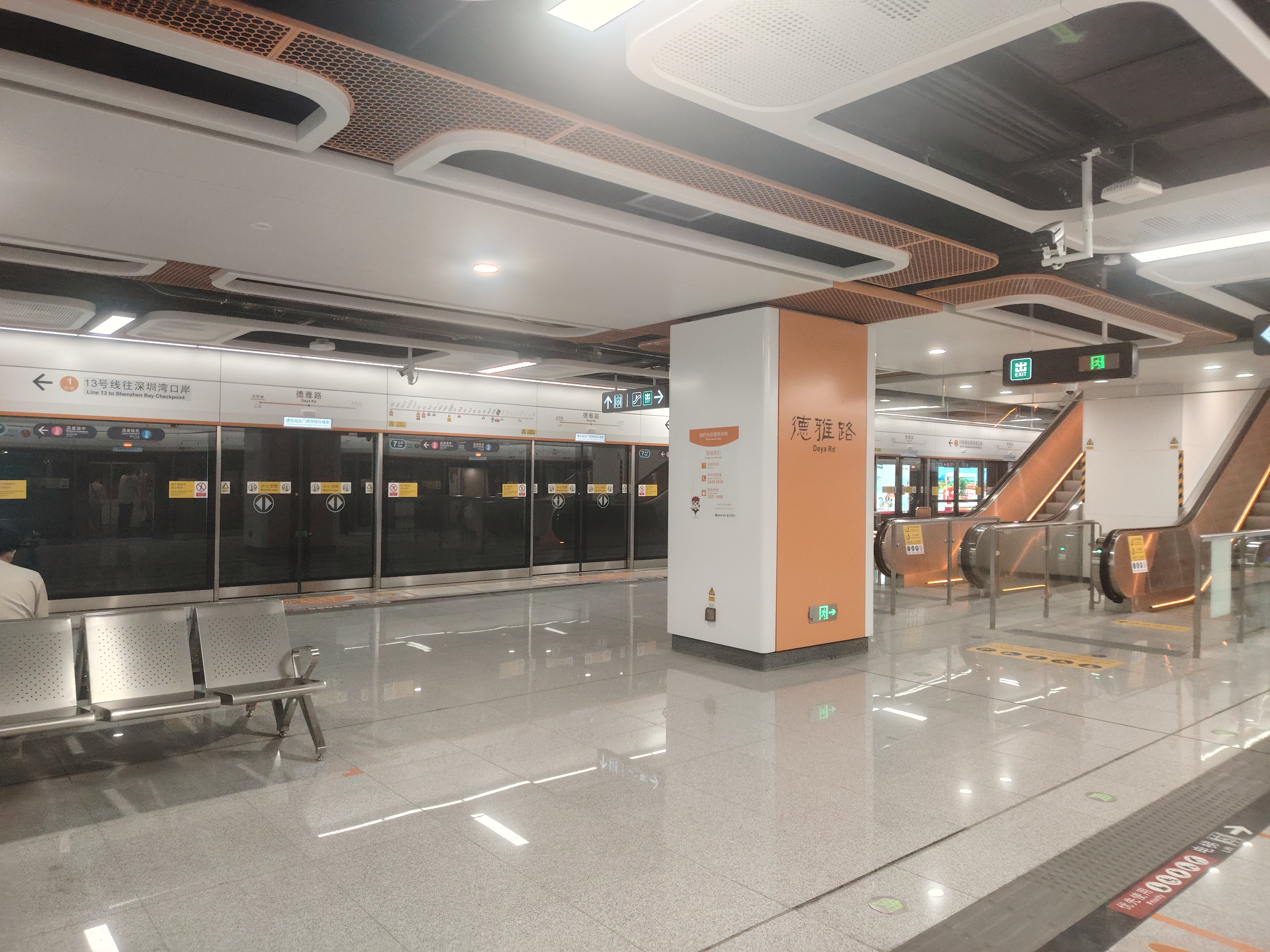
- Platform

Chinese name
- Chinese: 德雅路
Transcriptions
Standard Mandarin
- Hanyu Pinyin: Déyǎ Lù
Yue: Cantonese
- Yale Romanization: Dākngáah Lǒu
- Jyutping: dak1 ngaa5 lou6

General information
- Location: West side of intersection of Guanguang Road (观光路) and Guangqiao Road (光侨路); Boundary of Guangming Subdistrict and Fenghuang Subdistrict, Guangming District, Shenzhen, Guangdong; China
- Coordinates: 22°44′30″N 113°56′32″E
- Operated by: MTR China Railway Electrification Rail Transit (Shenzhen) Co., Ltd (MTR Rail Transit (Shenzhen) Co., Ltd. and China Railway Electrification Bureau Group Co., Ltd.)
- Line: Line 13
- Platforms: 2 (1 island platform)
- Tracks: 2

Construction
- Structure type: Underground
- Accessible: Yes

History
- Opened: 28 June 2026 (21 days ago)
- Previous names: Tongguan Road (同观路)

Services
Preceding station	Shenzhen Metro	Following station
Guangmingcheng towards Shenzhen Bay Checkpoint	Line 13	Fenghuang Town towards Lisonglang
Location

Deya Road station (Chinese: 德雅路站; pinyin: Déyǎ Lù Zhàn; Cantonese Yale: Dākngáah Lǒu Jaahm) is a station on Line 13 of Shenzhen Metro. It opened on 28 June 2026, and is located at the boundary of Guangming Subdistrict and Fenghuang Subdistrict in Guangming District.

== Station layout ==
The station is a two-level underground island platform station constructed using the cut-and-cover method.

G	-	Exits A-D
B1F; Concourse	Lobby	Ticket Machines, Customer Service, Shops, Station Control Room
B2F; Platforms	Platform 1	13 towards Shenzhen Bay Checkpoint (Guangmingcheng)
B2F; Platforms	Island platform, doors will open on the left
B2F; Platforms	Platform 2	13 towards Lisonglang (Fenghuang Town)

=== Entrances/exits ===
The station has 4 points of entry/exit. Exits B and D are equipped with elevators. Exit C has a toilet.

- : Guangqiao Road, Mingzheng Road, Guangming Phoenix School affiliated to Southern University of Science and Technology, Mingxin Garden, Guangming District Citizen Square, Guangming District People's Government
- : Guangguang Road, Deya Road, Guangming Phoenix School affiliated to Southern University of Science and Technology, Shenfang Chuanlinshan
- : Guangguang Road, Huitong Road, Guangming Investment Promotion Technology Park Area A, Guangming District City Exhibition Hall
- : Guangqiao Road, Chaofeng Road, Guangming Branch of Shenzhen Medical Security Bureau, Guangming District Tax Bureau, Shenzhen Experimental School Guangming Kelin Campus

== History ==
During construction, the station was called Tongguan Road station, and it topped out on 19 October 2022. The tunnel connection to Fenghuang Town broke through on 13 January 2023.

In April 2024, the naming convention for the station as Deya Road station in the "Shenzhen Rail Transit Phase IV Adjustment Project" issued by the Shenzhen Municipal Planning and Natural Resources Bureau was approved. The name was based on the road at the northwest corner of the Guangming District People's Government Office.

The station opened as part of Line 13 Phase II northern extension on 28 June 2026. From 30 June the same year, between 07:50 and 08:50 during the morning peak, additional trains will run between this station and Houhai.
