= Fenghuang Town station =

Shenzhen Metro Line 6 and Line 13 station

Fenghuang Town 凤凰城
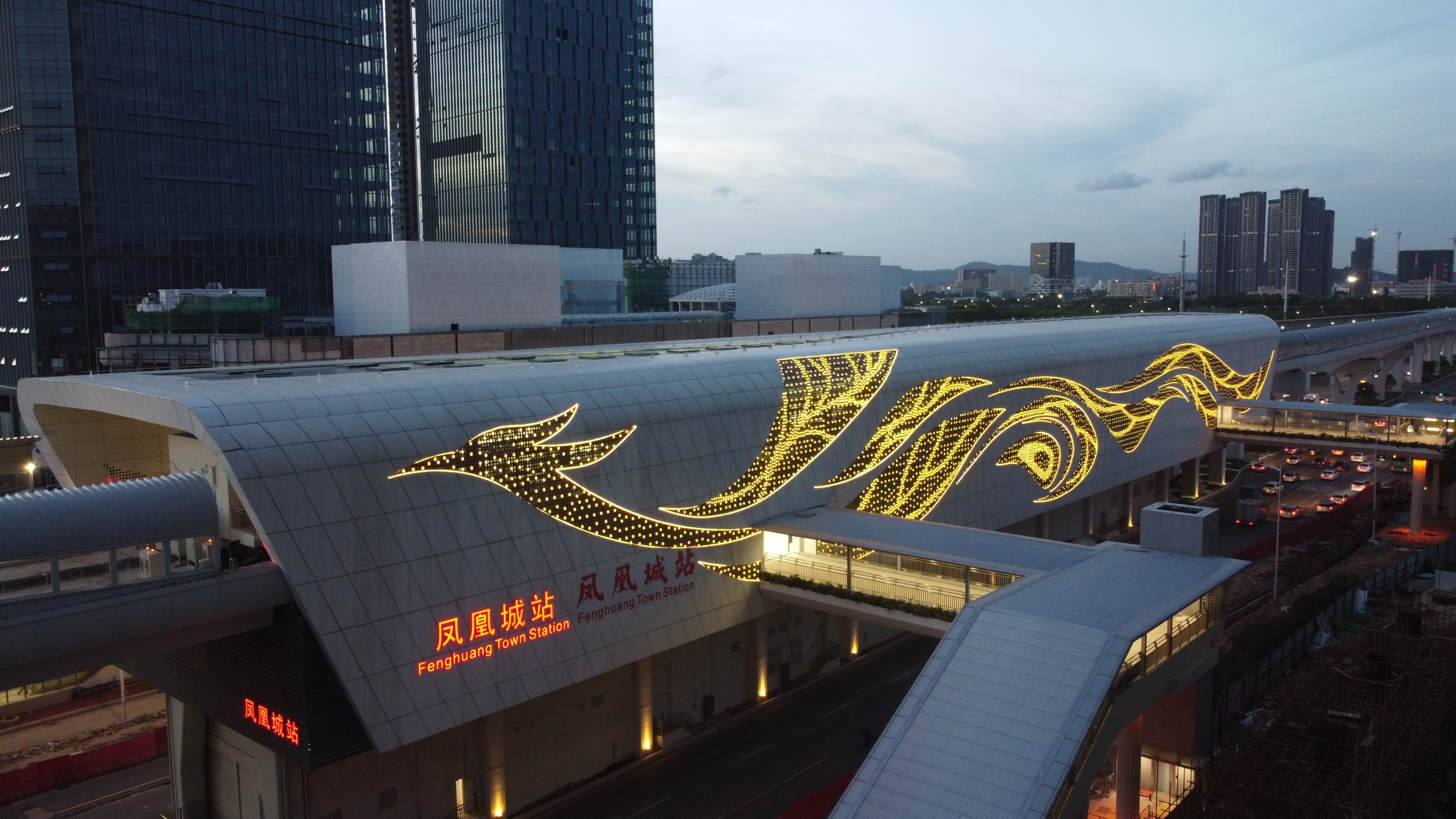
- Line 6 station exterior lighting (August 2023)

Chinese name
- Simplified Chinese: 凤凰城
- Traditional Chinese: 鳳凰城
Transcriptions
Standard Mandarin
- Hanyu Pinyin: Fènghuángchéng
Yue: Cantonese
- Yale Romanization: Fuhngwòhngsìhng
- Jyutping: fung6 wong4 sing4

General information
- Location: South side of intersection of Guanguang Road (观光路) and Guangming Avenue (光明大道); Fenghuang Subdistrict, Guangming District, Shenzhen, Guangdong; China
- Coordinates: 22°45′01″N 113°55′41″E
- Operator: SZMC (Shenzhen Metro Group) (Line 6); MTR China Railway Electrification Rail Transit (Shenzhen) Co., Ltd (MTR Rail Transit (Shenzhen) Co., Ltd. and China Railway Electrification Bureau Group Co., Ltd.) (Line 13)
- Lines: Line 6; Line 13
- Platforms: 4 (2 island platforms)
- Tracks: 4

Construction
- Structure type: Elevated (Line 6); Underground (Line 13)
- Accessible: Yes

History
- Opened: Line 6: 18 August 2020 (5 years ago); Line 13: 28 June 2026 (44 days ago)

Services
Preceding station	Shenzhen Metro	Following station
Guangming Street towards Songgang	Line 6	Changzhen towards Science Museum
Deya Road towards Shenzhen Bay Checkpoint	Line 13	Yueliang Road towards Lisonglang
Location

Fenghuang Town station (Chinese: 凤凰城站; pinyin: Fènghuángchéng Zhàn; Cantonese Yale: Fuhngwòhngsìhng Jaahm) is an interchange station between Line 6 and Line 13 of Shenzhen Metro. It is located in Fenghuang Subdistrict in Guangming District, along Guangming Avenue. The Line 6 station opened on 18 August 2020. The Line 13 station opened on 28 June 2026.

On the south side of the station, there is a connecting track to the Changzhen Depot that also serves as a double storage track. The Science Museum bound platform is the termination platform of trains after 23:30.

== Station layout ==
The Line 6 section of the station is elevated, while the Line 13 section is underground. During construction of Line 6, in addition to the Line 13 concourse transfer interface, a vertical elevator was additionally reserved for the Line 6 platform to the Line 13 transfer passage and concourse, making it the first of its kind on the network.

The station is also one of the four distinctive stations on the Line 13 Phase II northern extension. Its design theme is "The Phoenix is Coming, Rebirth from the Ashes," which incorporates auspicious elements such as phoenix wings and tails into its design language. The pillars are transformed into phoenix wings, and golden lines extend from the ceiling to the pillars, making the station resemble an underground art totem.

3F; 6 Platforms		6 towards Science Museum (Changzhen)
3F; 6 Platforms	Island platform, doors will open on the left
3F; 6 Platforms		6 towards Songgang (Guangming Street)
2F; 6 Concourse	6 Lobby	Ticket Machines, Customer Service
G	-	Exits A-H
B2F; 13 Concourse	13 Lobby	Ticket Machines, Customer Service, Station Control Room, Toilets
B3F; 13 Platforms	Platform 1	13 towards Shenzhen Bay Checkpoint (Deya Road)
B3F; 13 Platforms	Island platform, doors will open on the left
B3F; 13 Platforms	Platform 2	13 towards Lisonglang (Yueliang Road)

=== Line 6 ===
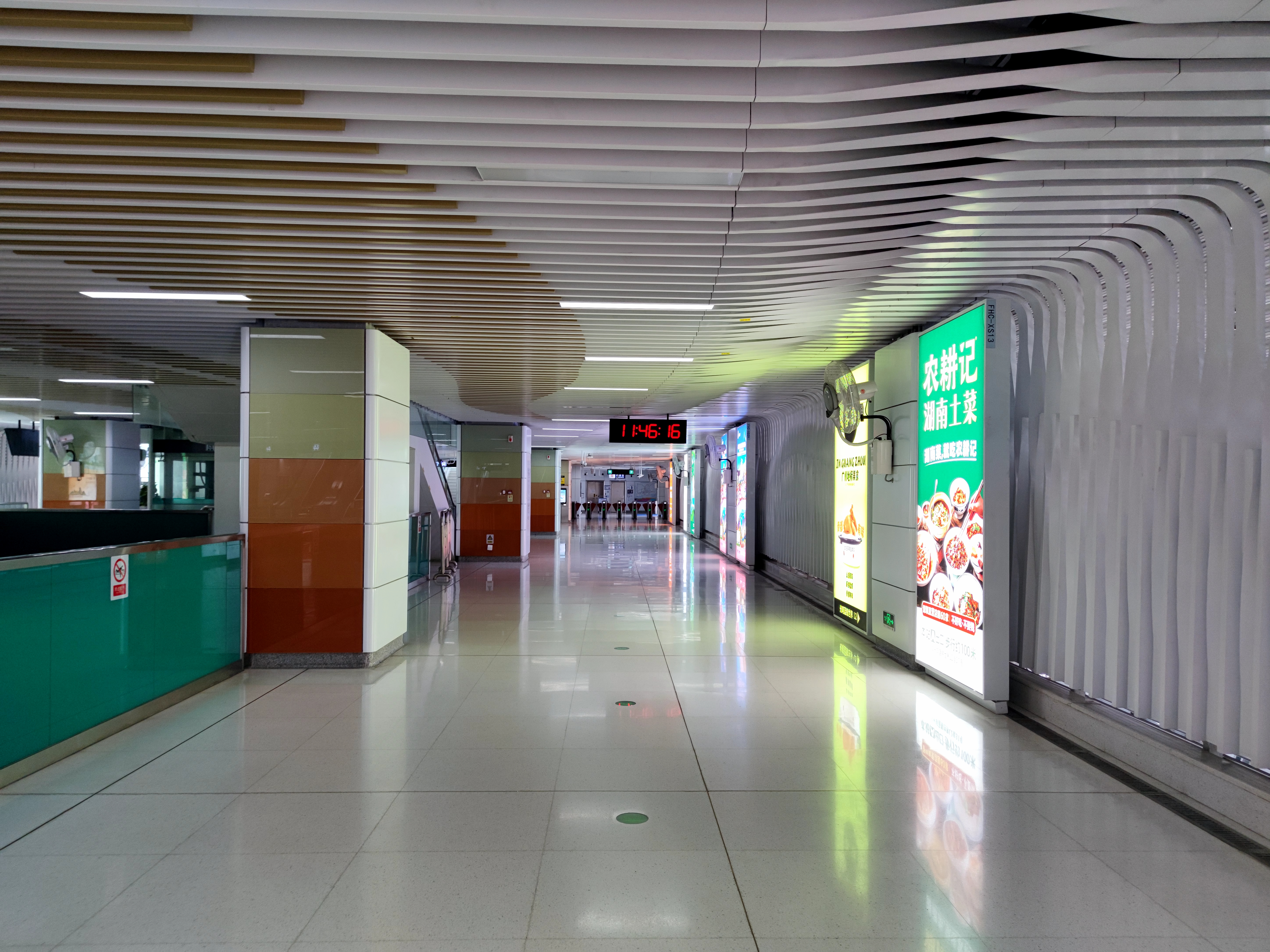
Concourse

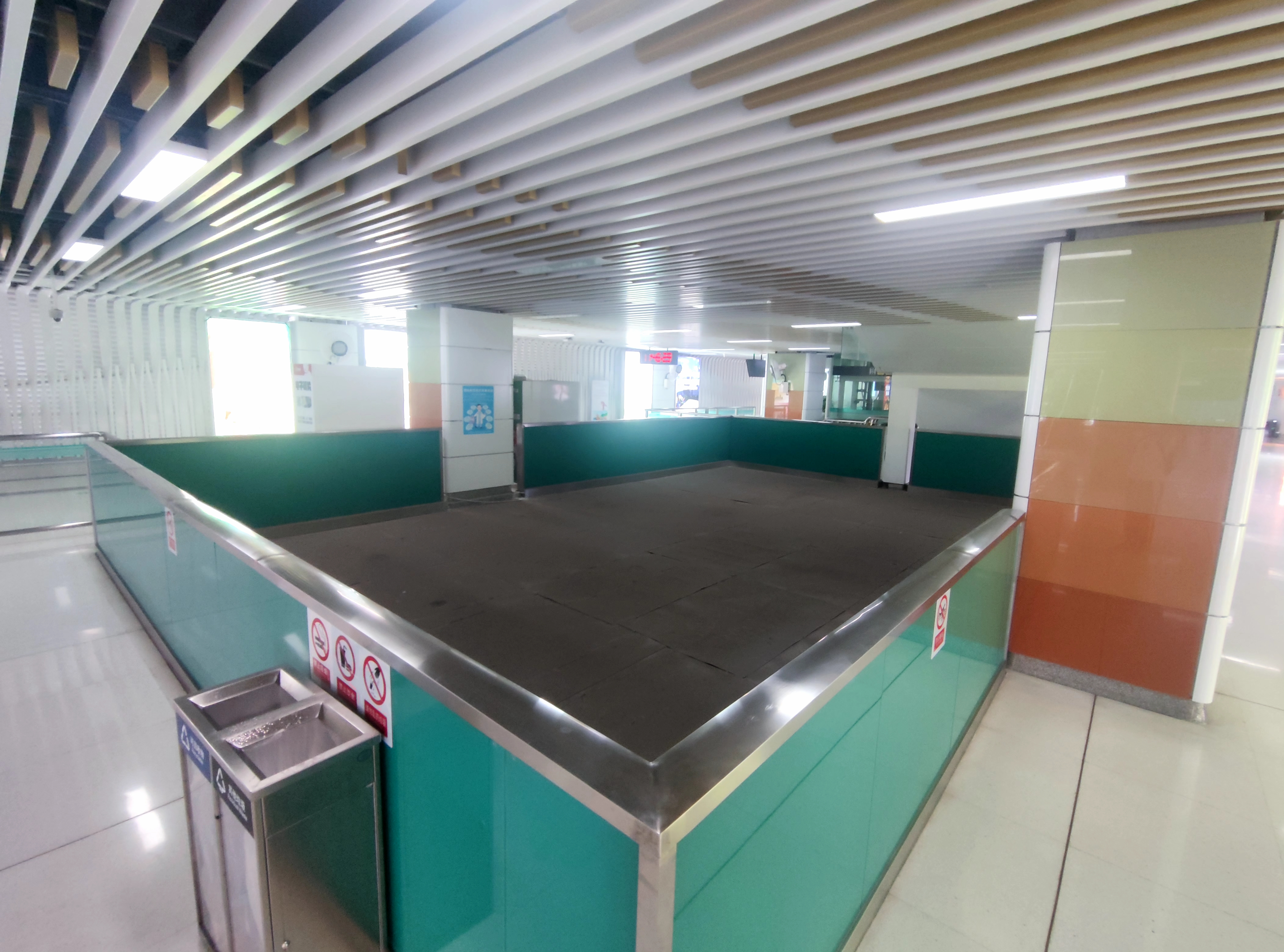
Reserved transfer node to Line 13

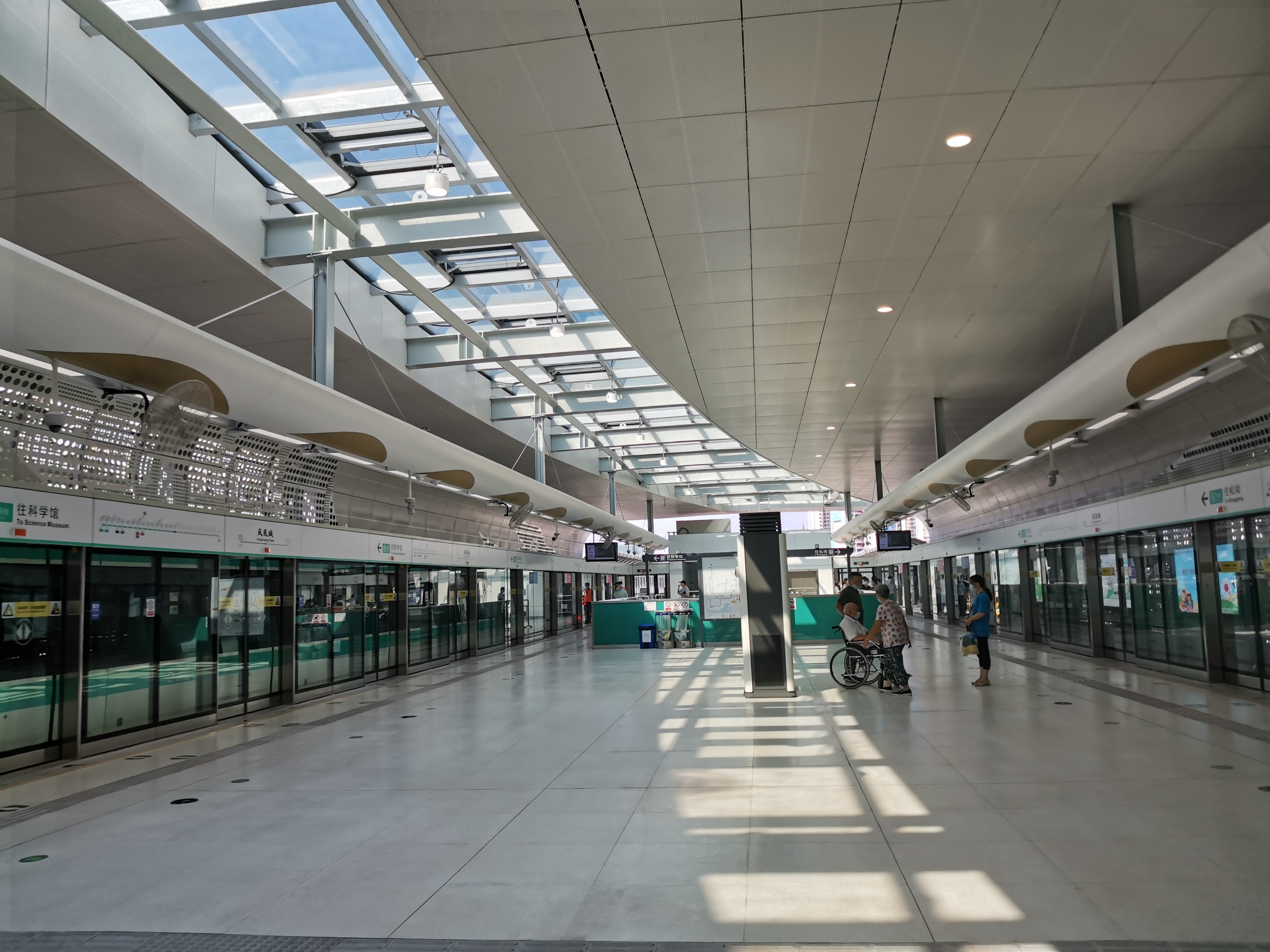
Platform

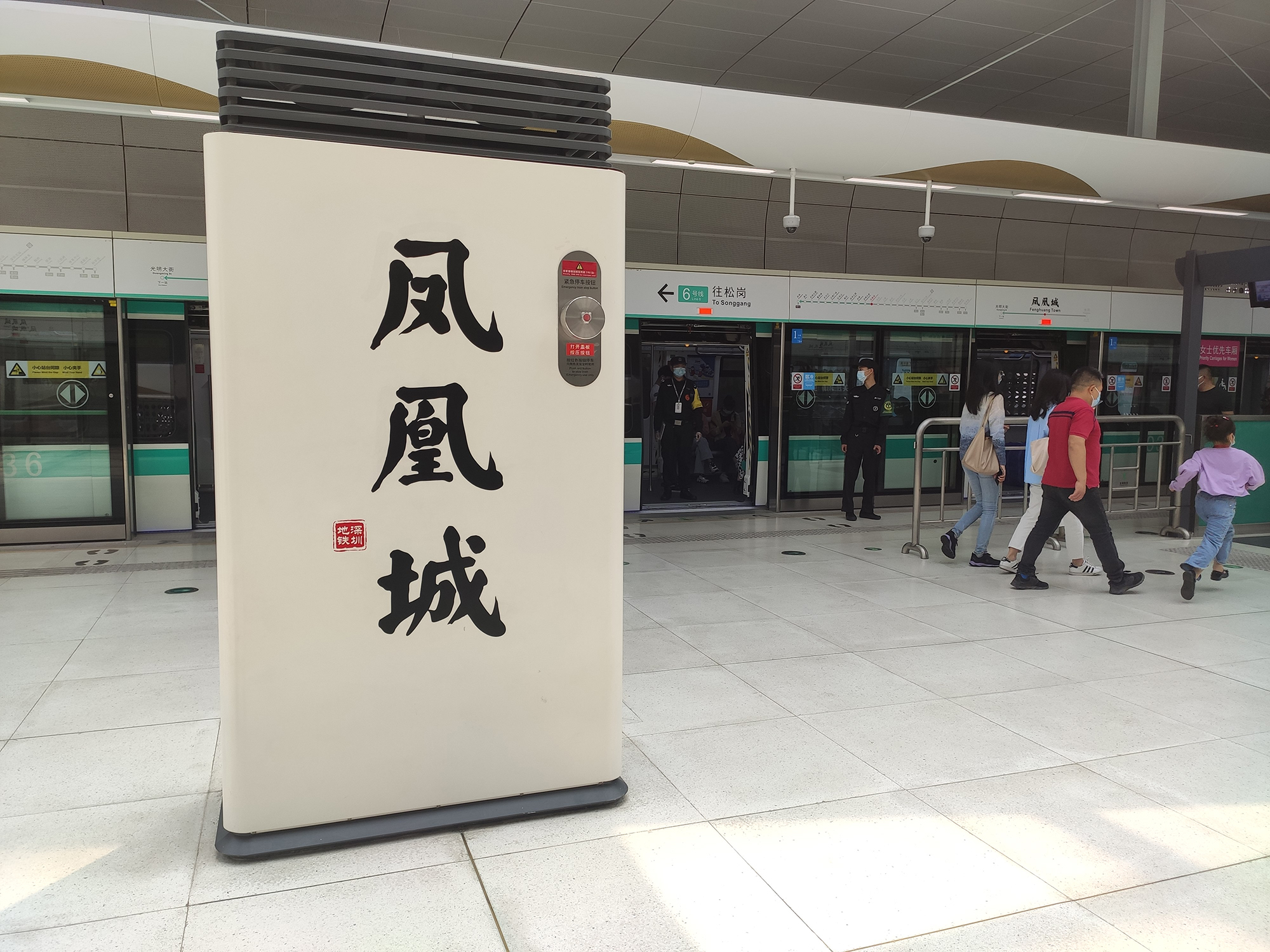
Calligraphy

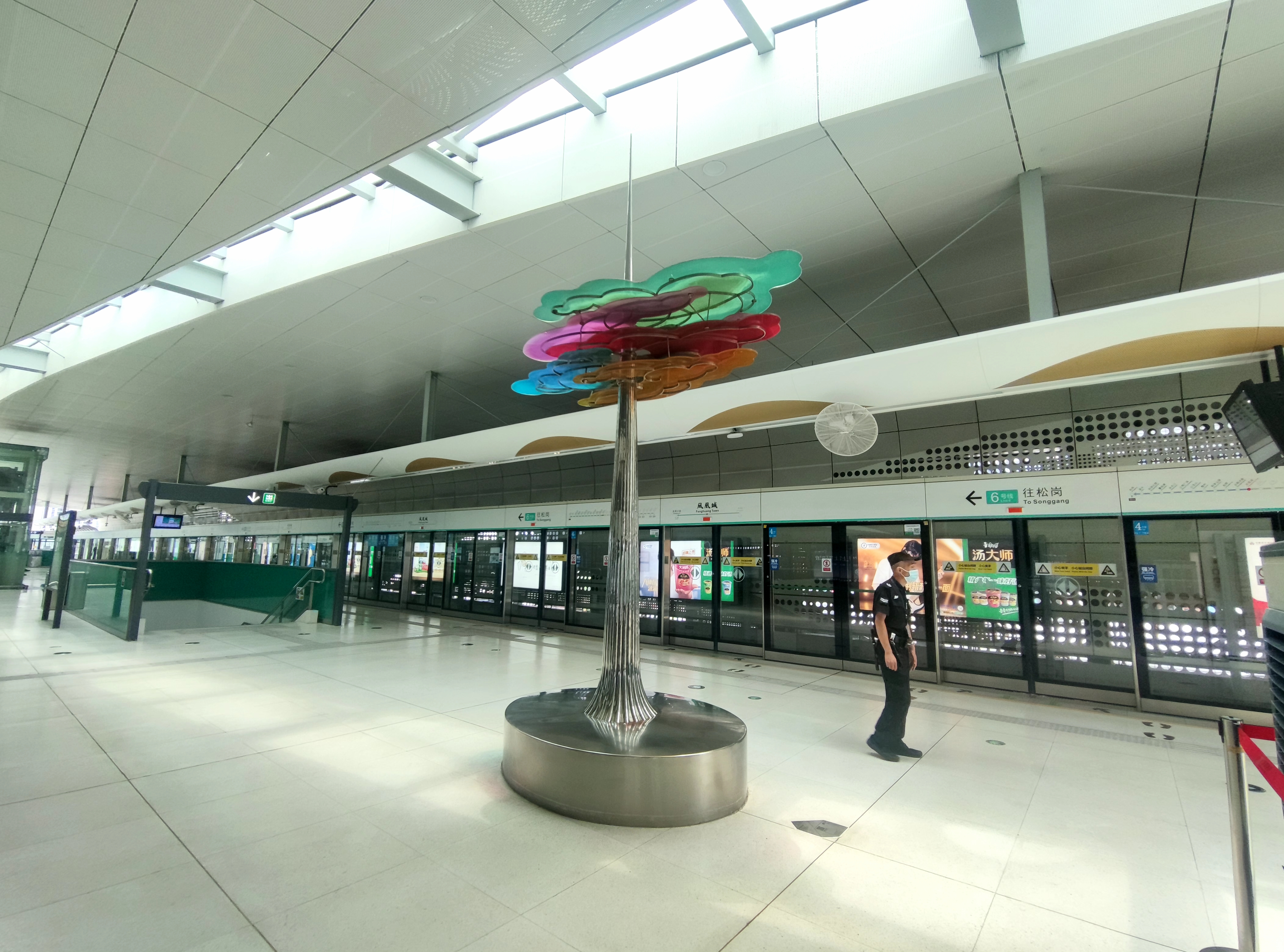
Platform art installation ("Auspicious" - Artist: He Yanqing [何岩青])

=== Line 13 ===
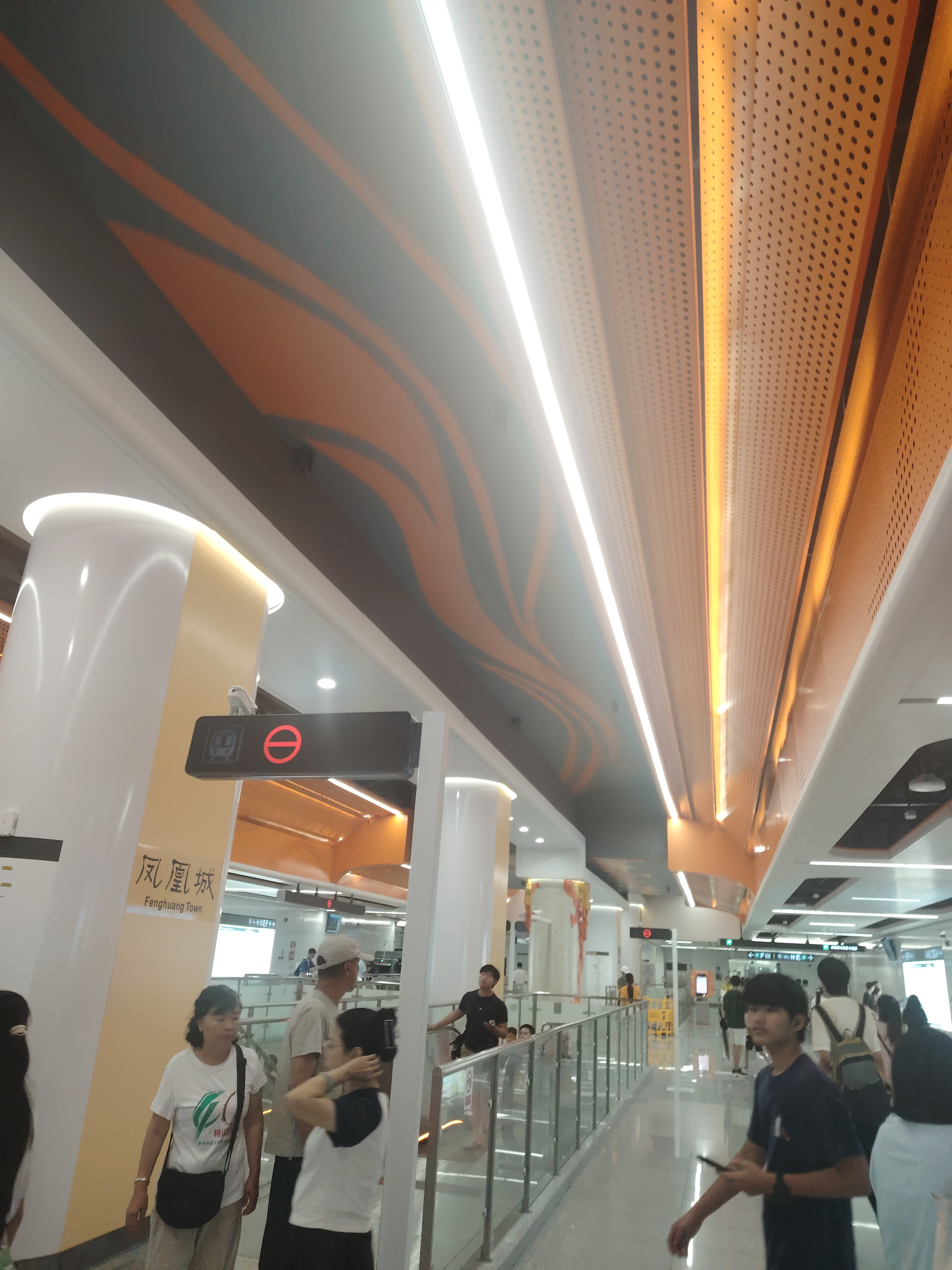
Concourse

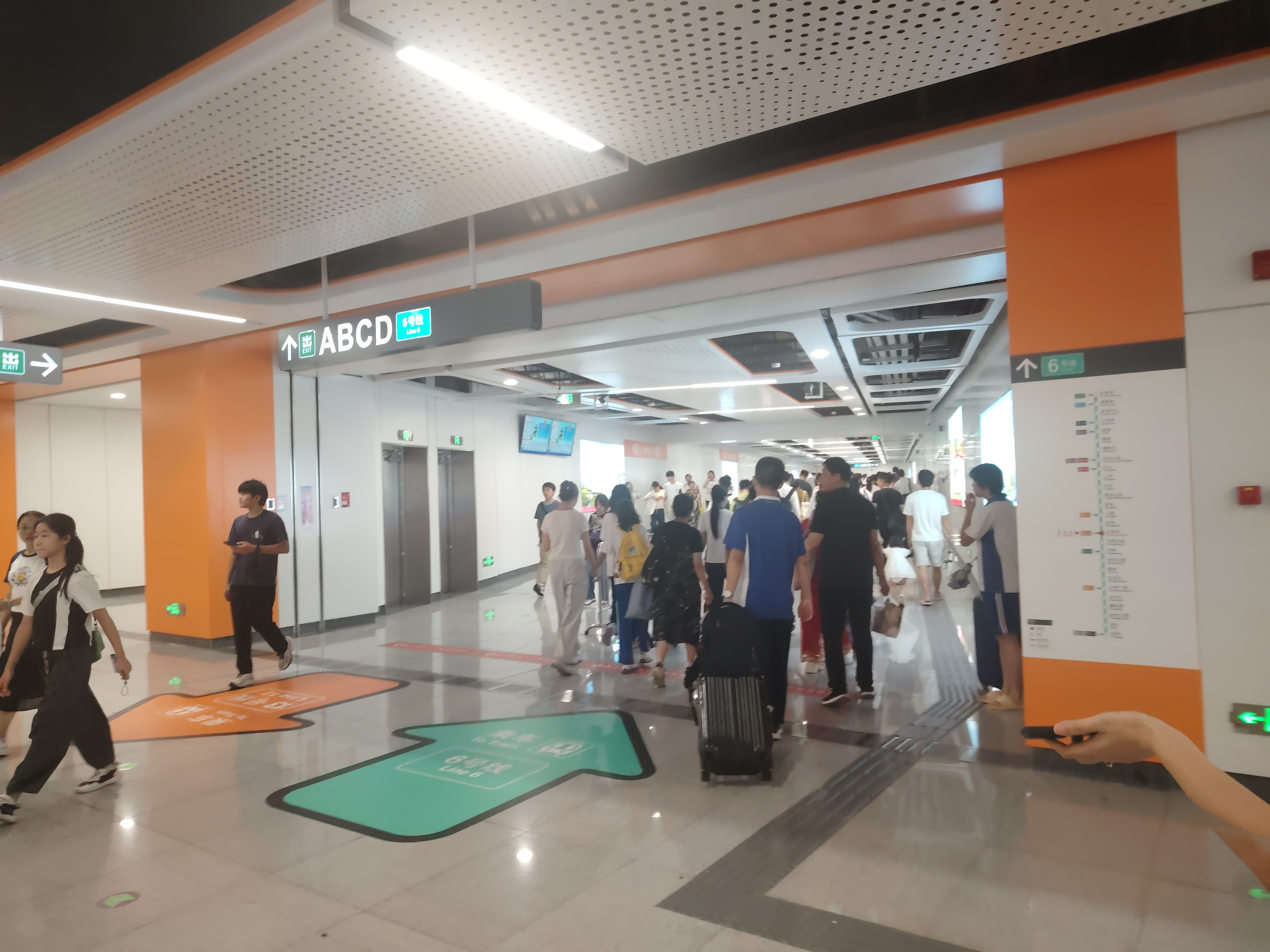
Transfer passage to Line 6

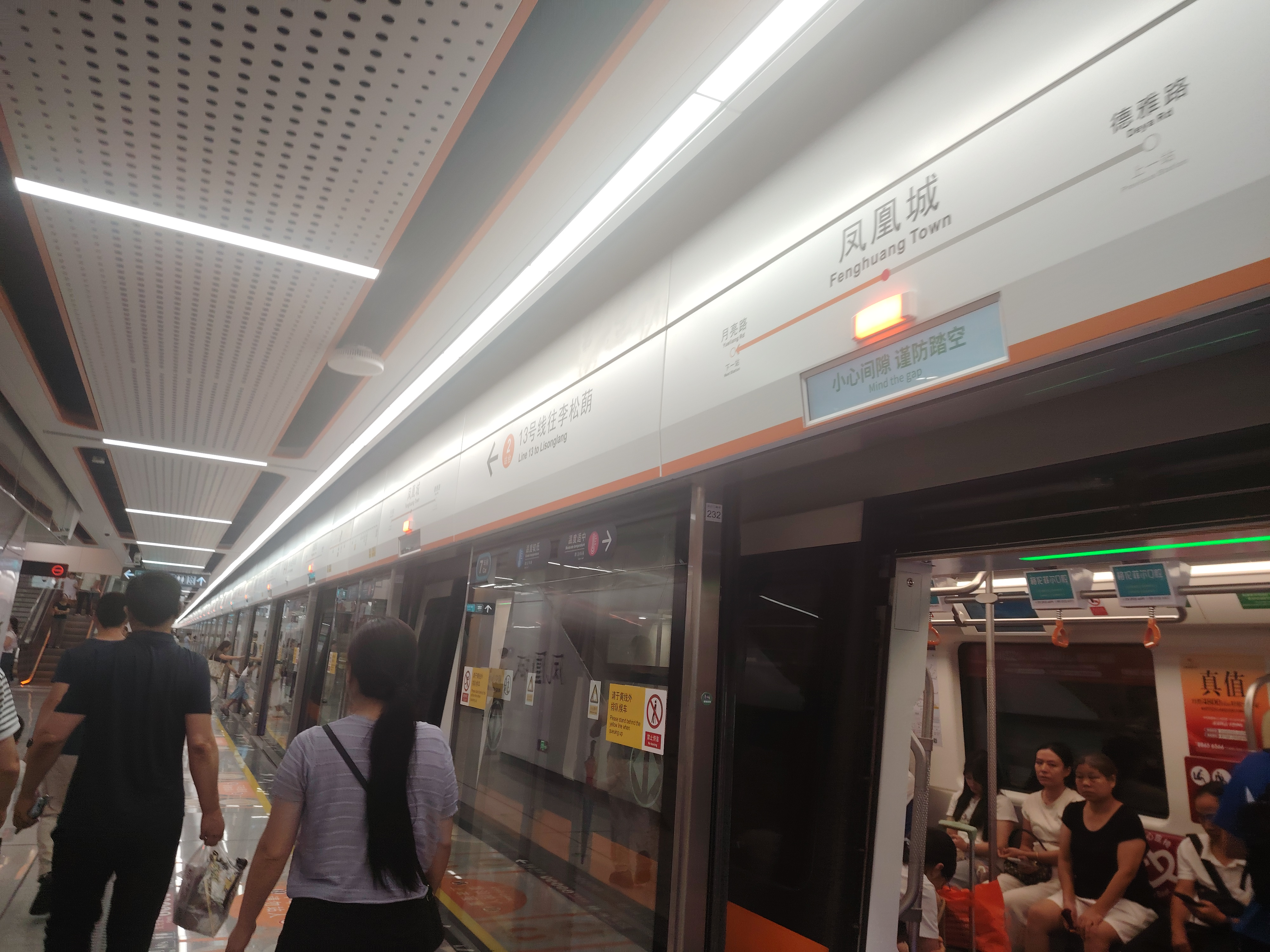
Platform 2 (towards Lisonglang)

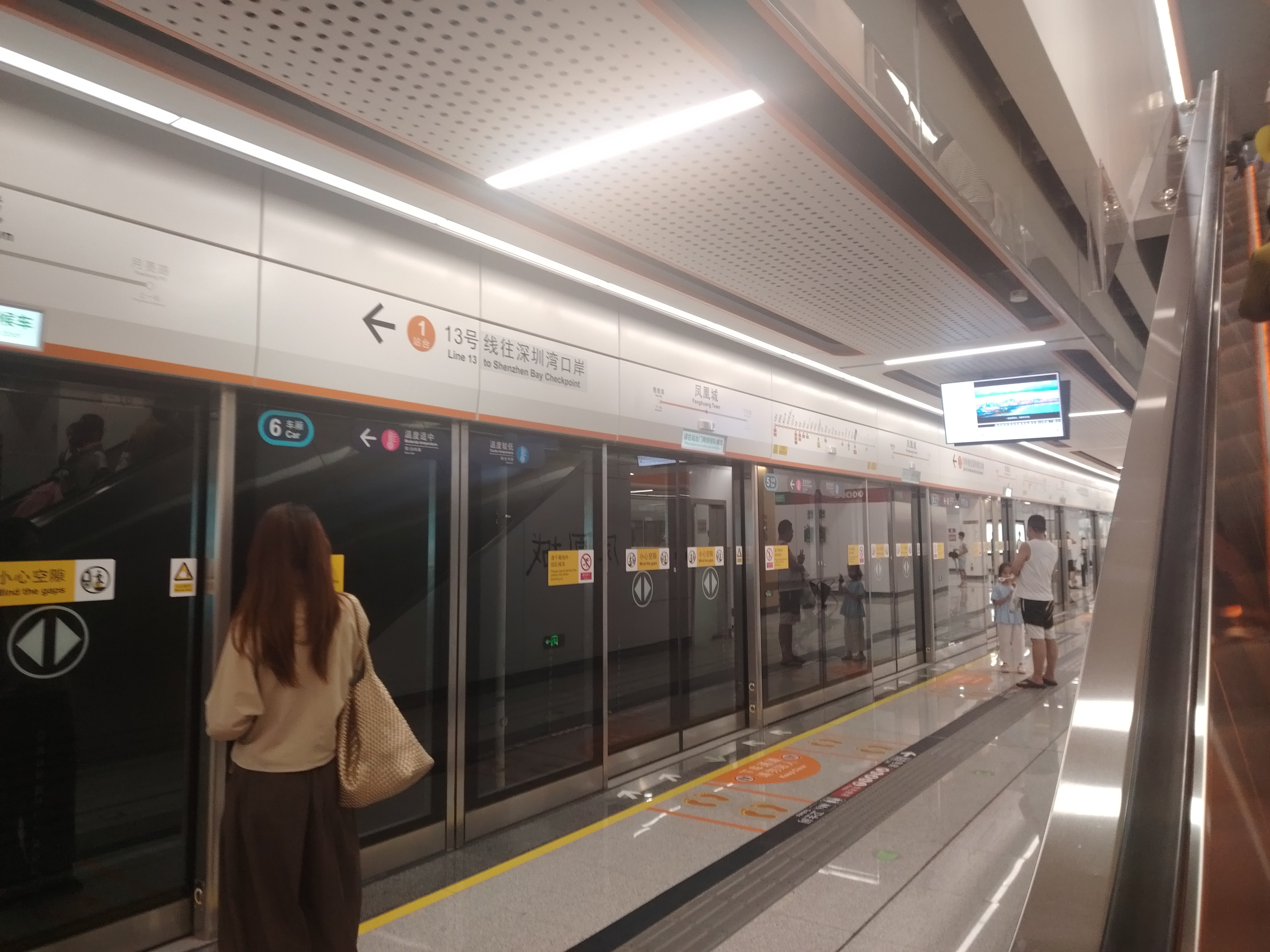
Platform 1 (towards Dongjiaotou)

=== Entrances/exits ===
The station has 8 points of entry/exit. Exits A, F and H are equipped with an elevators. It also has a passage leading to the nearby Bright Blue Whale World Shopping Center. Exits C and D have passageways leading to the nearby Shenzhen Guangming Wanda Plaza.

- : East side of Guangming Avenue (S), Guangming Blue Whale World, Logan Jiulong Terrace, OFILM Headquarters R&D Center
- : East side of Guangming Avenue (N), Guangming District People's Government, Shenzhen Experimental School Guangming Campus
- : West side of Guangming Avenue (N), Guangming Wanda Plaza, Special Zone Jianfa Yuefu Plaza, Century Jingyuan Base, Guangming Kaiming Park
- : West Side of Guangming Avenue (S), Guangming Wanda Plaza, Special Zone Jianfa Yuefu Plaza, Guangming CIMC Zhiyuan
- : East Side of Guangming Avenue, Guangming Blue Whale World, Longguang Jiulong Terrace
- : CPC Guangming District Committee, Shenzhen Market Supervision Administration, Guangming Supervision Bureau, Guangming District Petition Bureau, Guangming District Library, Guangming District Civic Square, Guangming Cultural and Art Center, Guangming New City Park, Shenzhen Experimental School Guangming Campus
- : West Side of Guangming Avenue, EVOC Intelligent Technology Company Limited, Guangming Four Points Sheraton Hotel
- : West Side of Guangming Avenue, Guangming Wanda Plaza, Special Zone Jianfa Yuefu Plaza, Kaiming Park
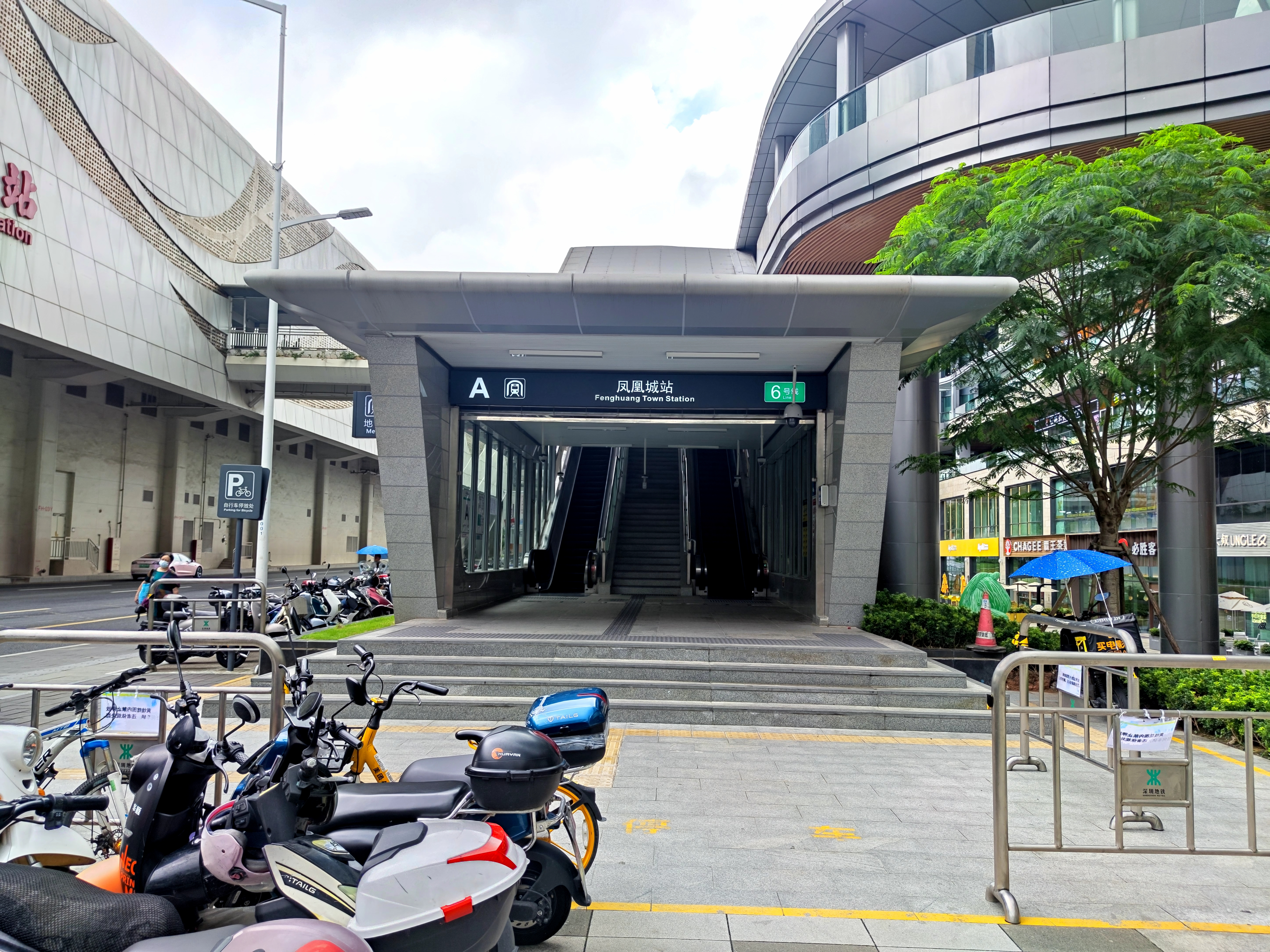
Entrance A

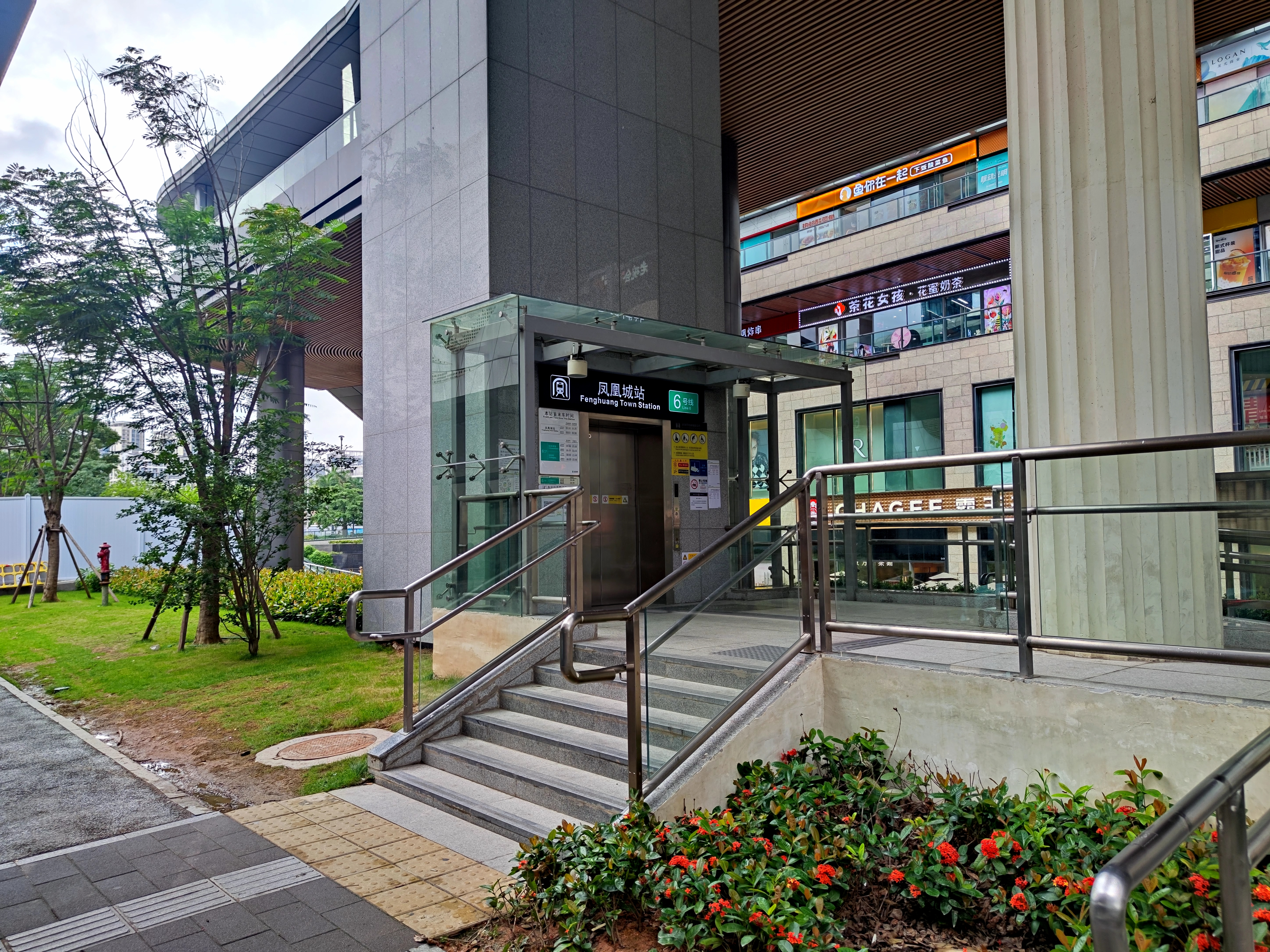
Elevator of entrance A

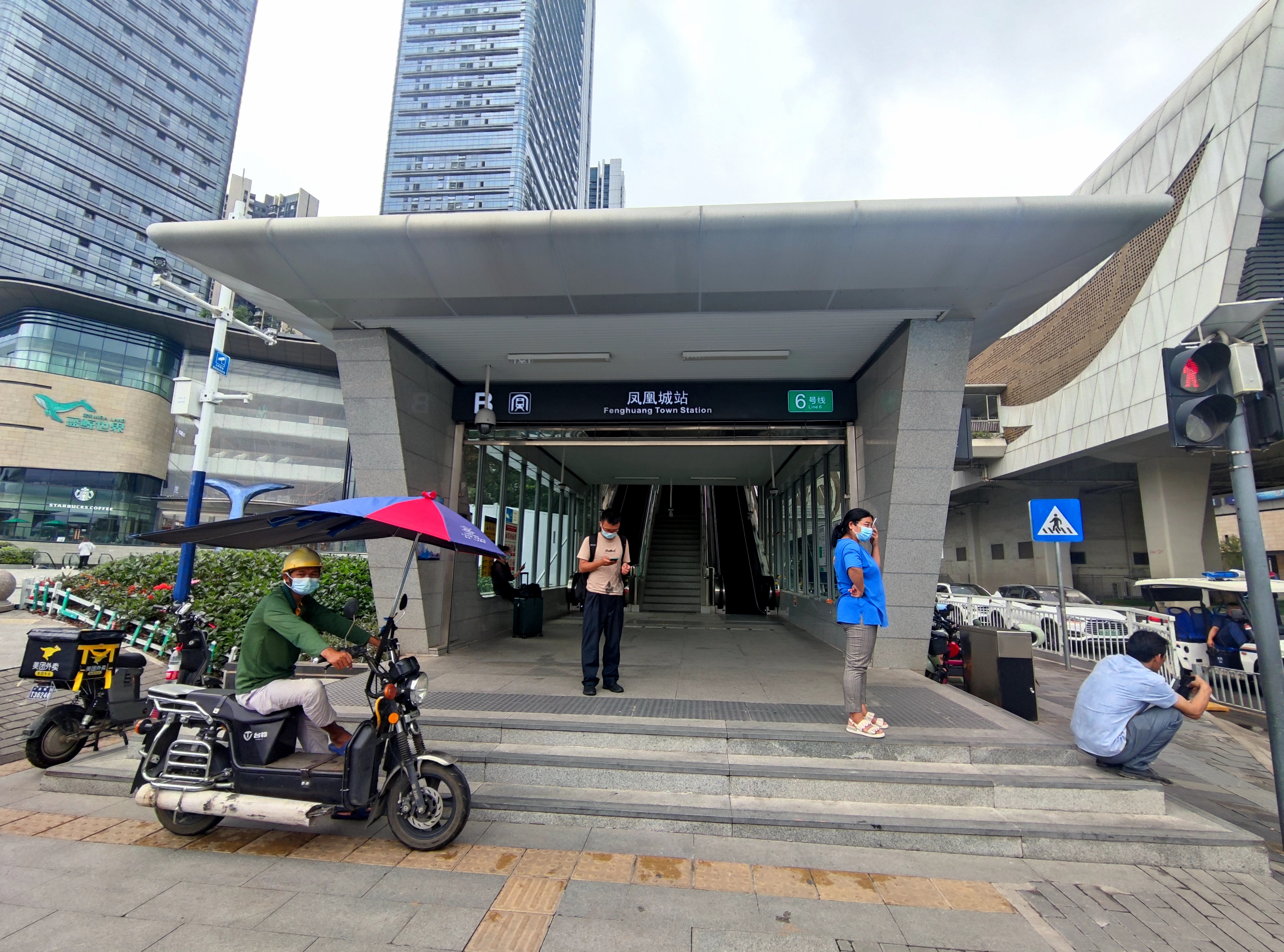
Entrance B

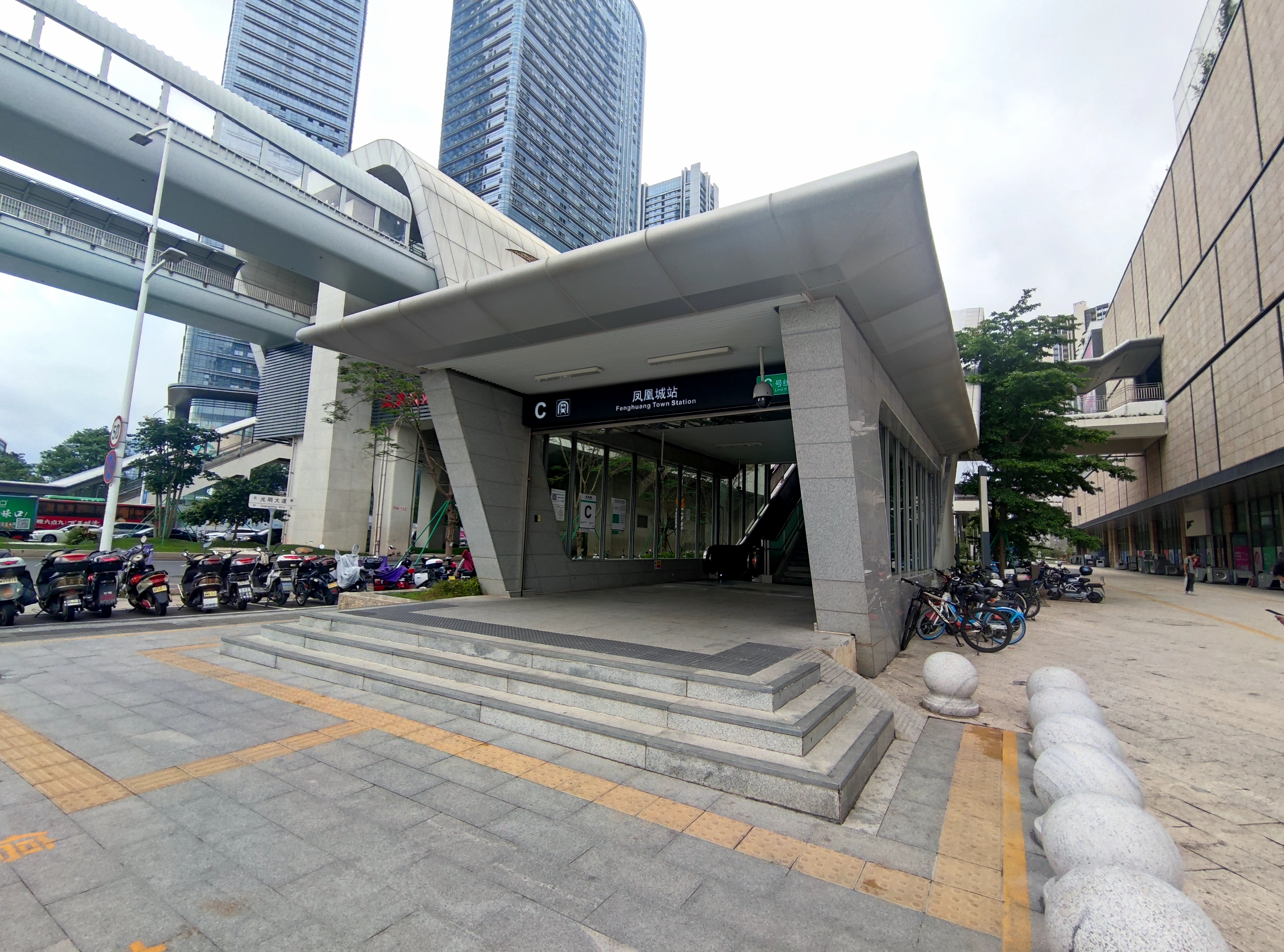
Entrance C

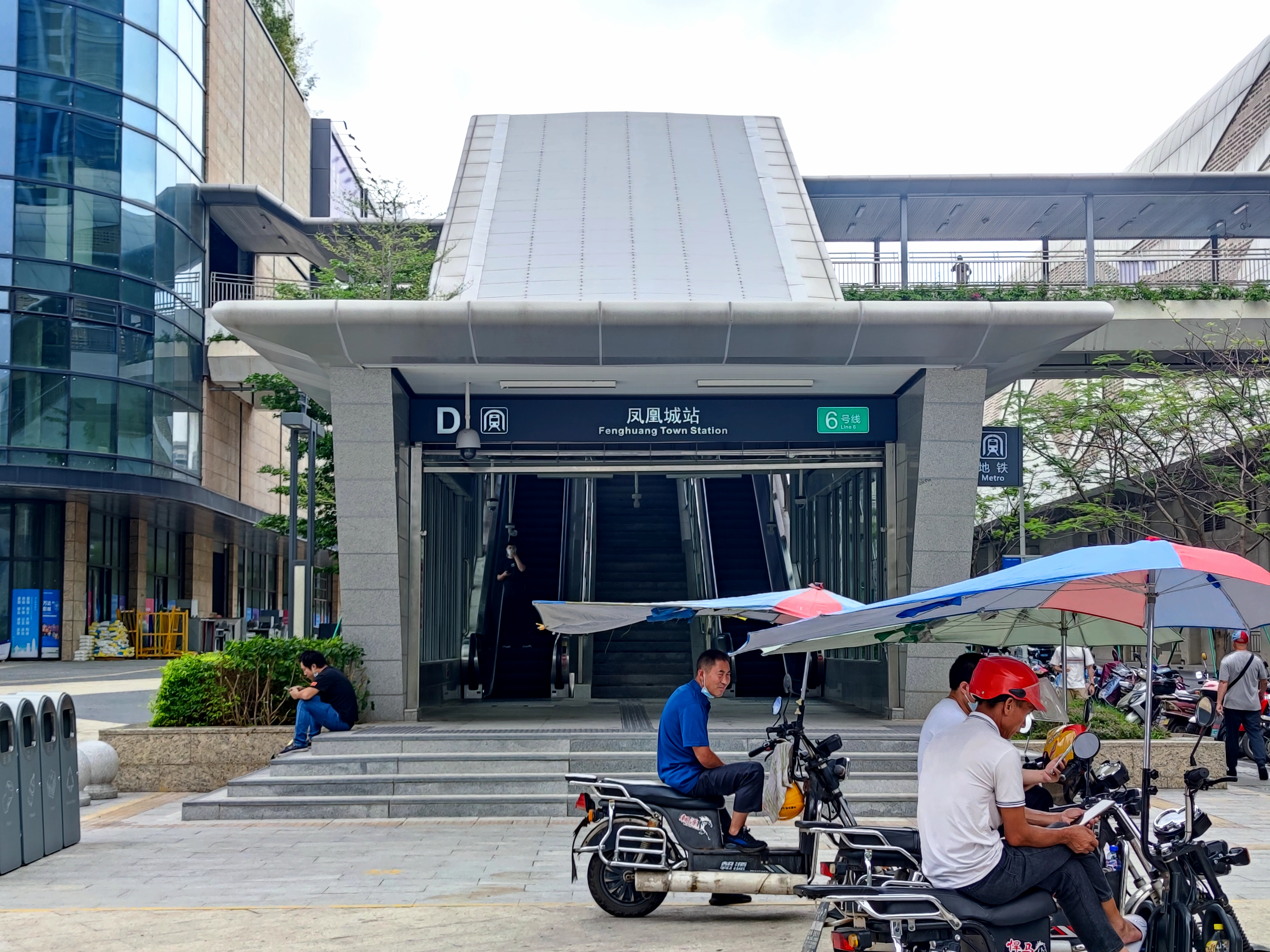
Entrance D

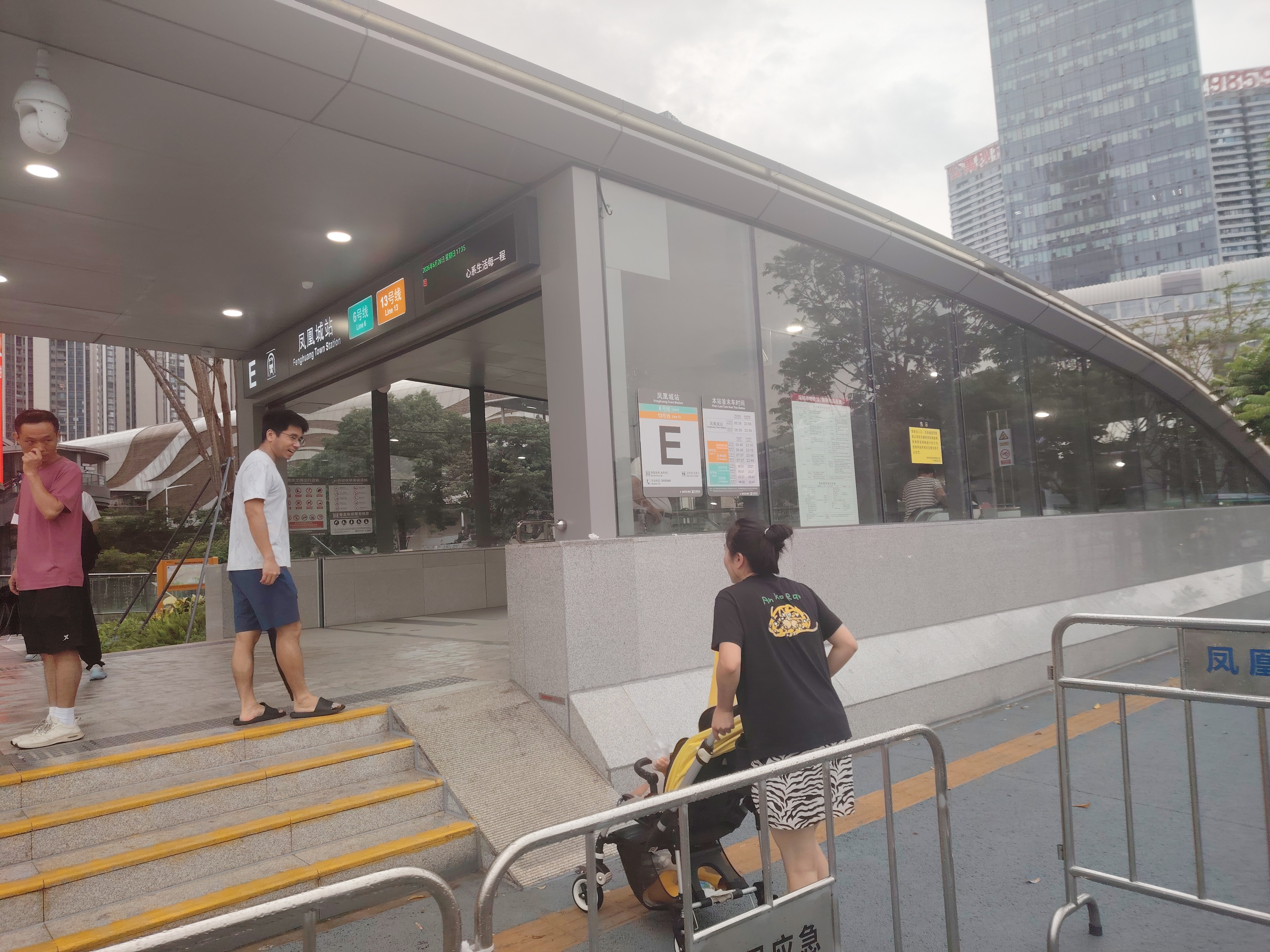
Entrance E

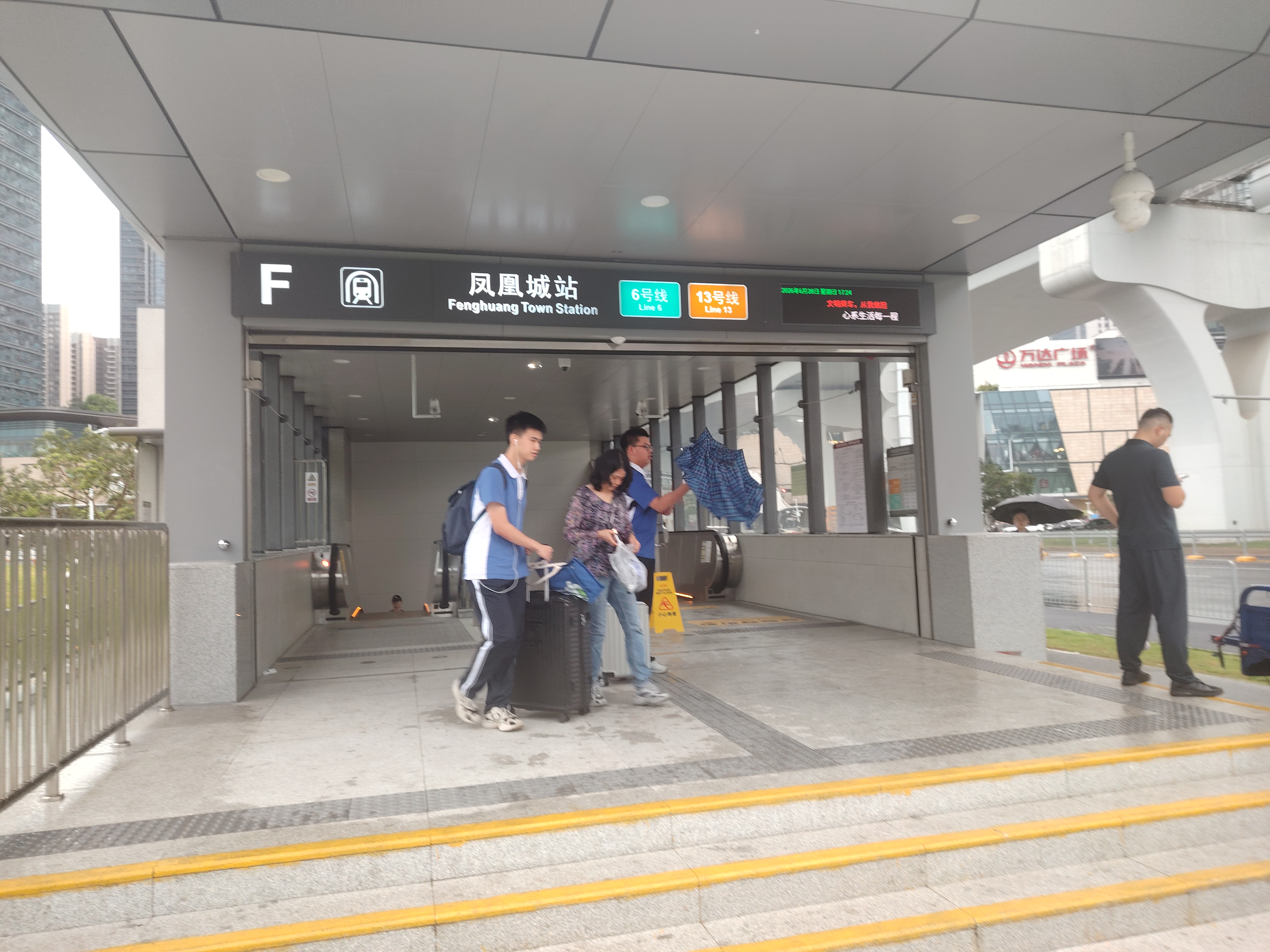
Entrance F

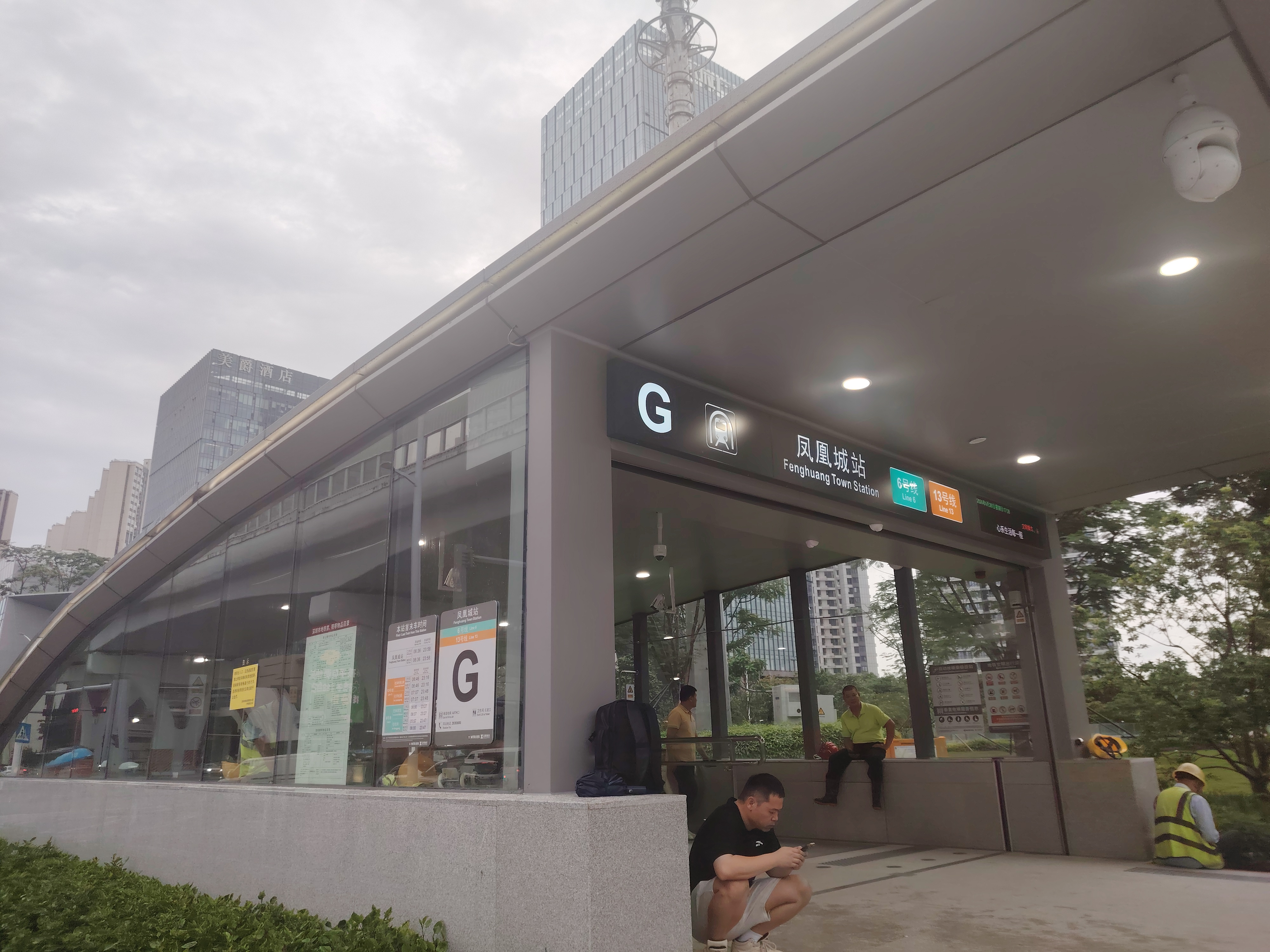
Entrance G

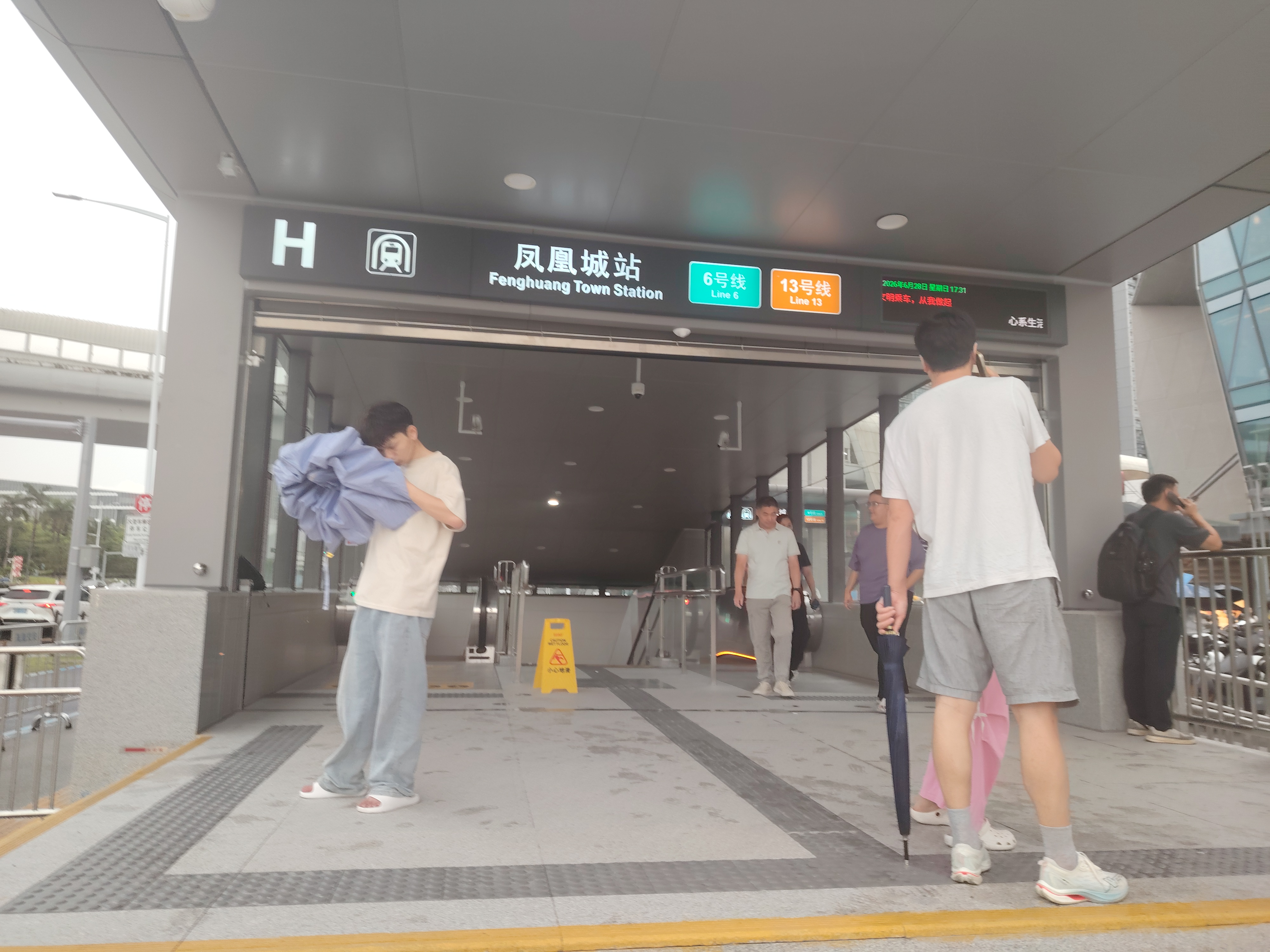
Entrance H
