= Guangming Street station =

Metro station in Shenzhen, Guangdong, China

Coordinates: 22°32′58″N 114°7′22″E

Guangming Street 光明大街
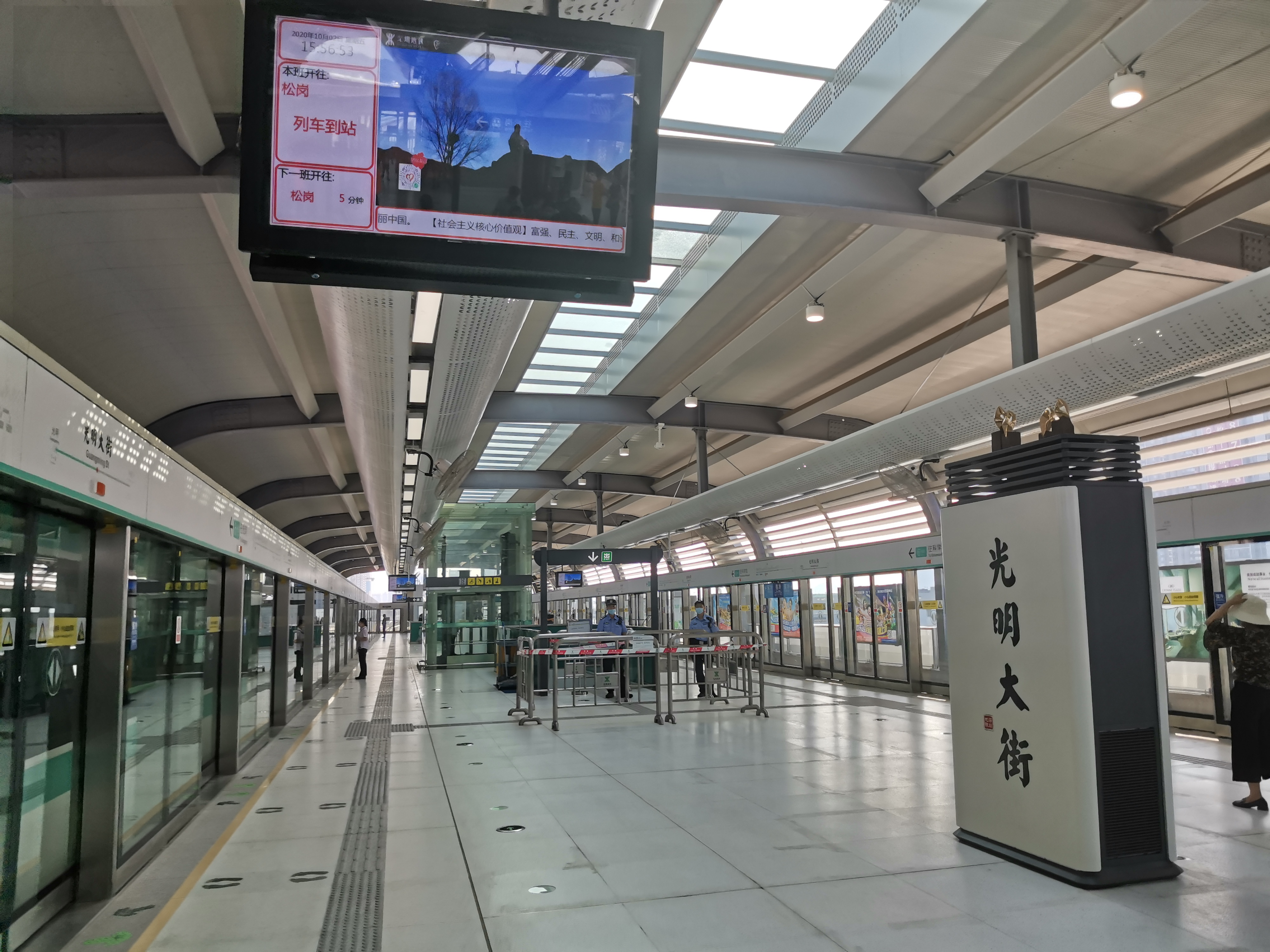

General information
- Location: Guangming District, Shenzhen, Guangdong; China
- Operated by: SZMC (Shenzhen Metro Group)
- Line: Line 6
- Platforms: 2 (1 island platform)
- Tracks: 2

Construction
- Structure type: Elevated
- Accessible: Yes

History
- Opened: 18 August 2020

Services
| Preceding station | Shenzhen Metro | Following station |
|---|---|---|
| Guangming towards Songgang | Line 6 | Fenghuang Town towards Science Museum |
Location

Guangming Street station (Chinese: 光明大街站; pinyin: Guāngmíng Dàjiē Zhàn) is a station on Line 6 of the Shenzhen Metro. It opened on 18 August 2020.

== Station layout ==
| 3F; Platforms | Platform | ← Line 6 towards Science Museum (Fenghuang Town) |
| 3F; Platforms | Island platform, doors will open on the left |
| 3F; Platforms | Platform | → Line 6 towards Songgang (Guangming) → |
| 2F; Concourse | Lobby | Customer Service, Shops, Vending machines, ATMs |
| G | - | Exit |

== Exits ==
| Exit | Destination |
|---|---|
| Exit A | Xindi Central, Chenguang Dairy |
| Exit B | Guangming Hotel, Binheyuan Community |
| Exit C | Green Space Renovation Project, Guangming Social Security branch |
| Exit D | Dongzhou Primary School |

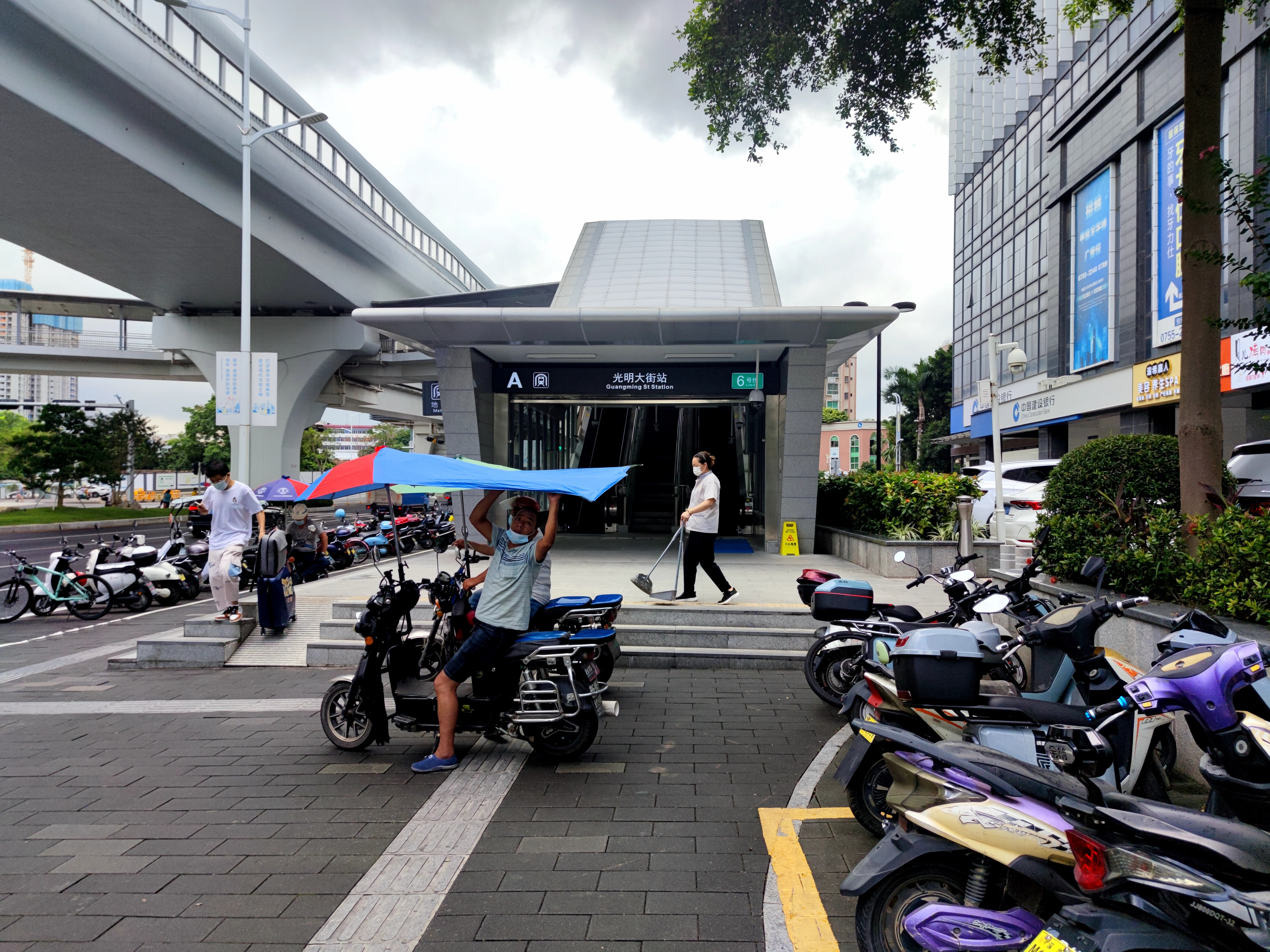
Exit A

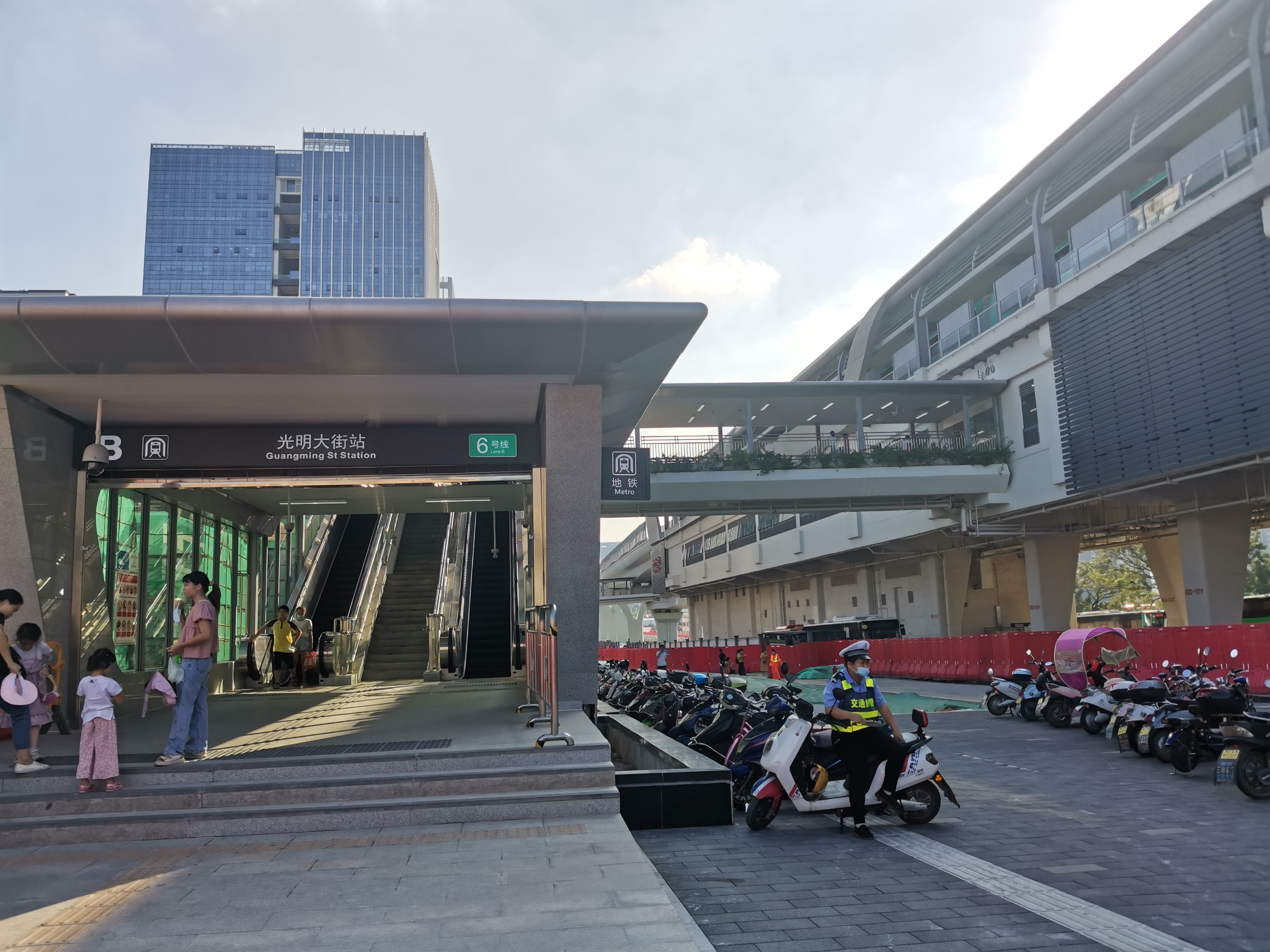
Exit B

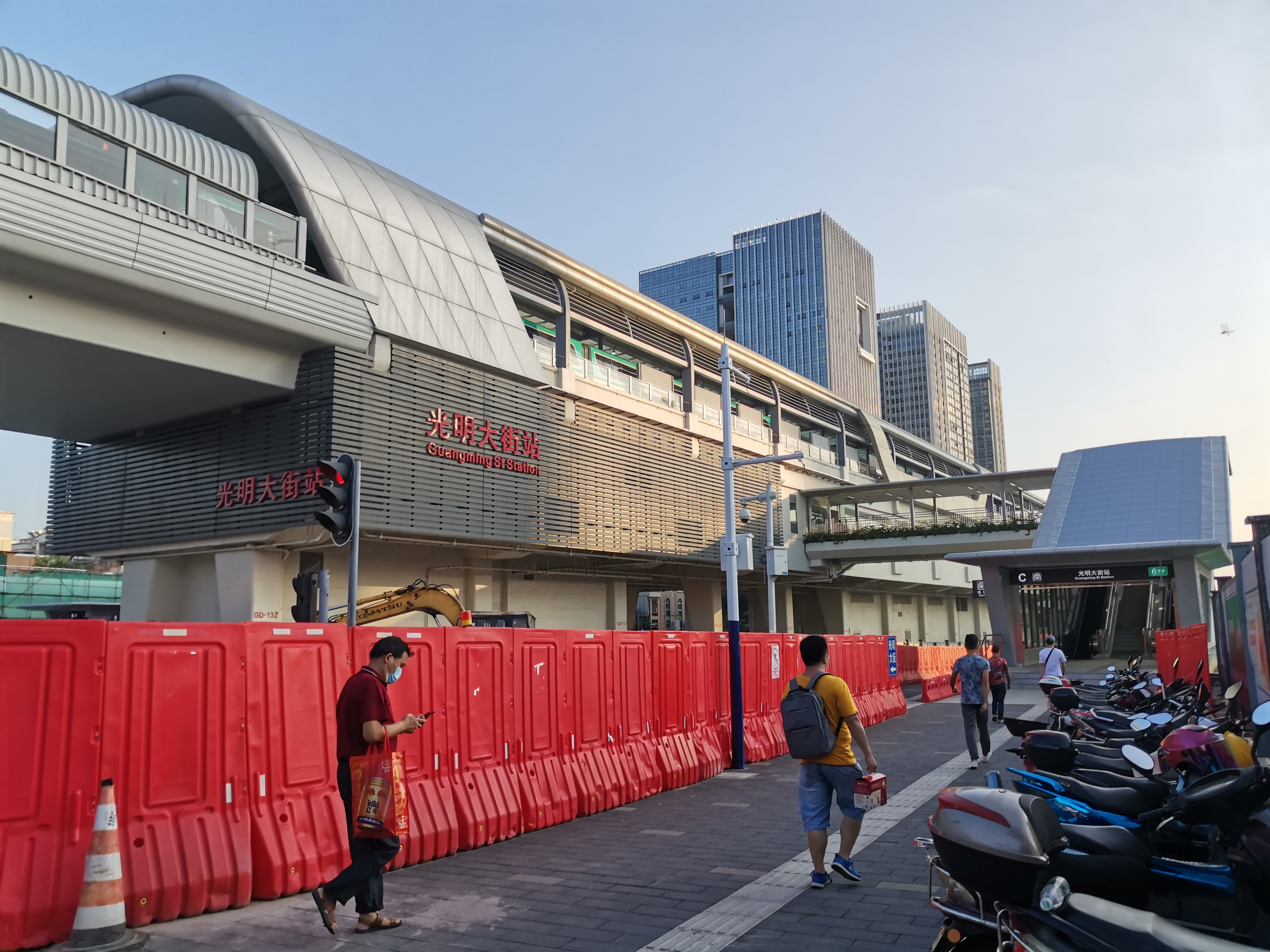
Exit C

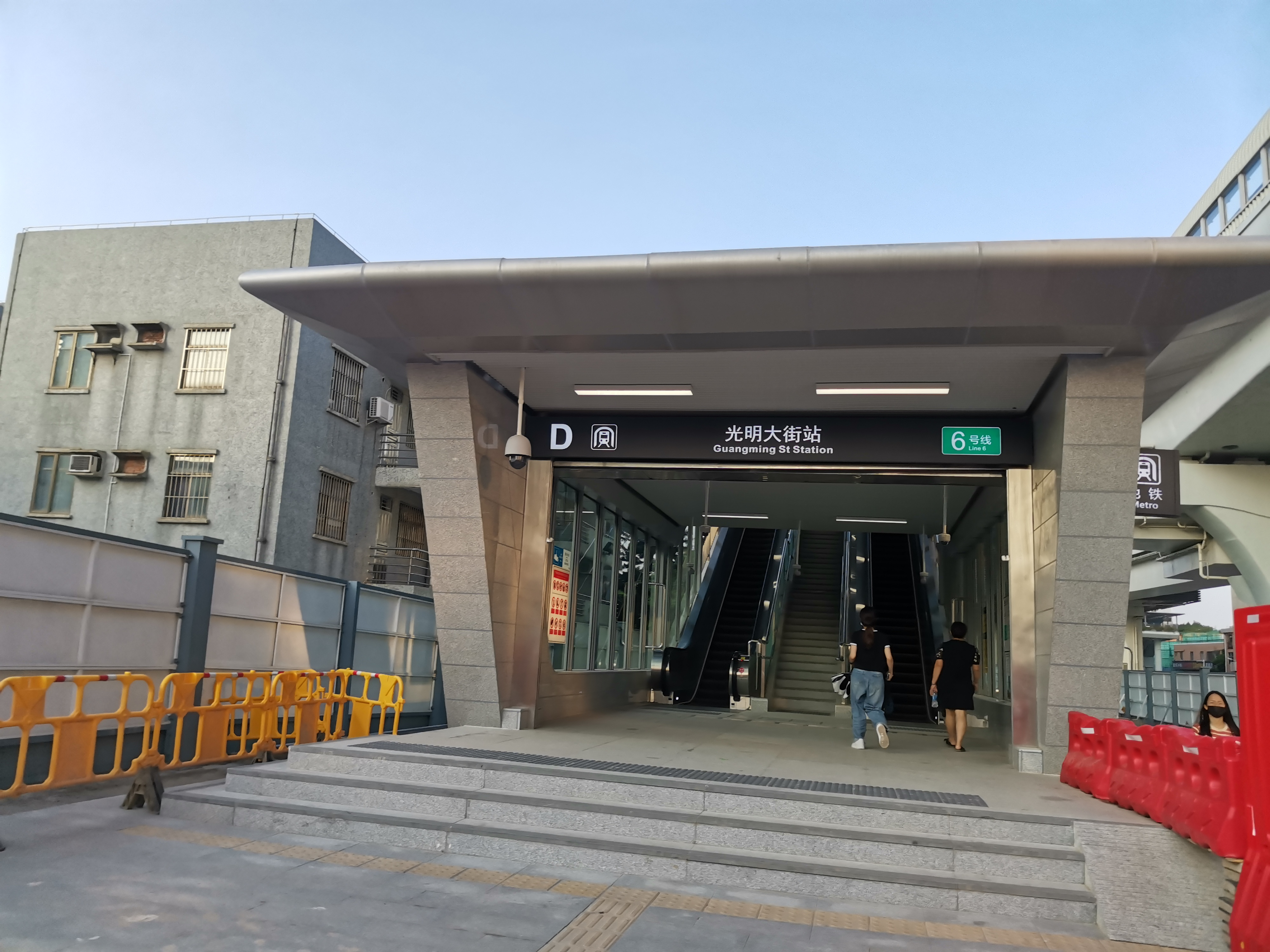
Exit D
