= Gongming Square station =

Shenzhen Metro Line 6 and Line 13 station

Gongming Square 公明广场
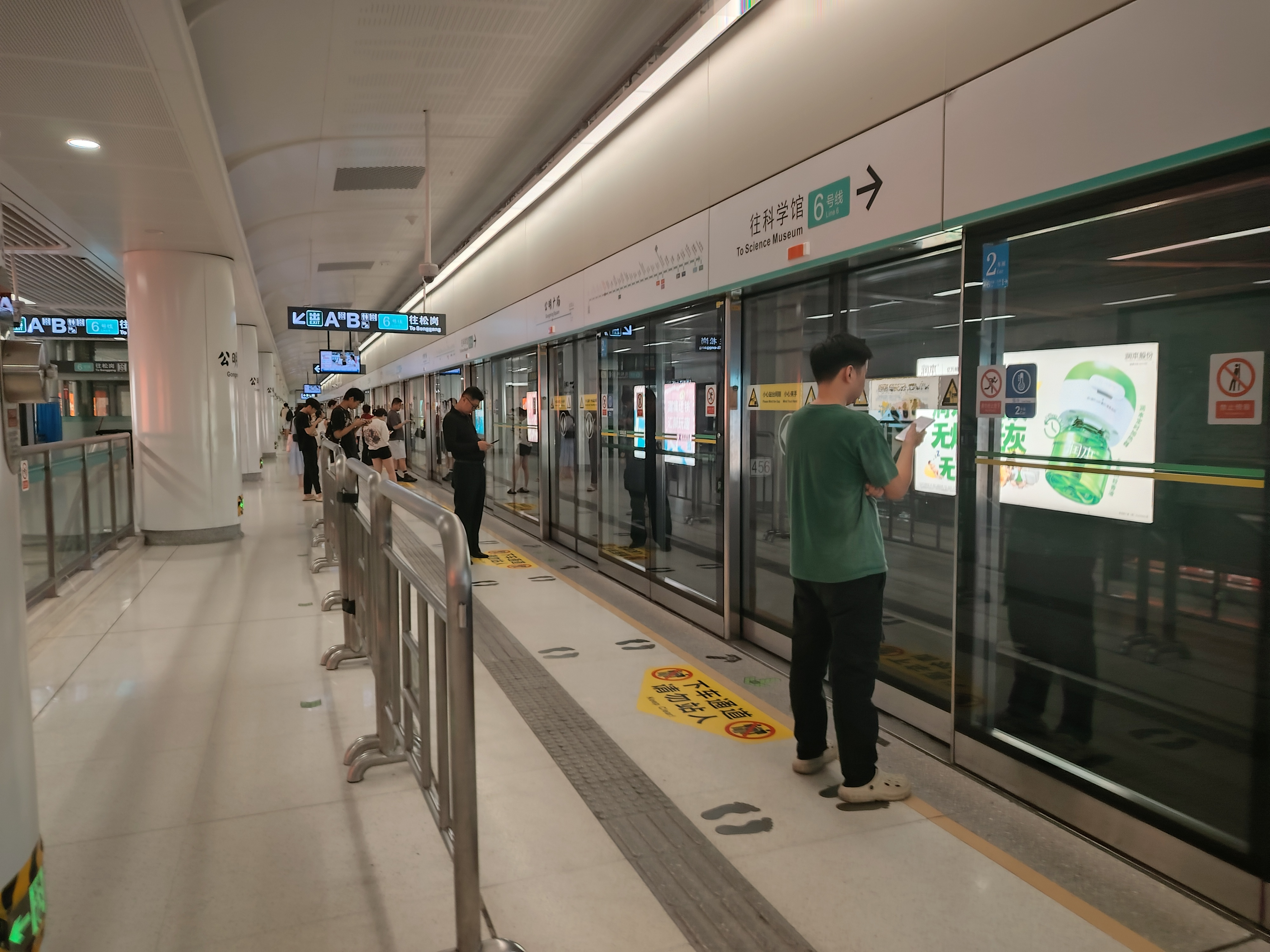
- Line 6 platform (towards Science Museum)

Chinese name
- Simplified Chinese: 公明广场
- Traditional Chinese: 公明廣場
Transcriptions
Standard Mandarin
- Hanyu Pinyin: Gōngmíng Guǎngcháng
Yue: Cantonese
- Yale Romanization: Gūngmìhng Gwóngchèuhng
- Jyutping: gung1 ming4 gwong2 coeng4

General information
- Location: Side of intersection of Songbai Road (松白路) and Changchun Road (长春路), in front of Gongming Square; Gongming Subdistrict, Guangming District, Shenzhen, Guangdong; China
- Coordinates: 22°32′58″N 114°7′22″E
- Operated by: SZMC (Shenzhen Metro Group) (Line 6); MTR China Railway Electrification Rail Transit (Shenzhen) Co., Ltd (MTR Rail Transit (Shenzhen) Co., Ltd. and China Railway Electrification Bureau Group Co., Ltd.) (Line 13)
- Lines: Line 6; Line 13
- Platforms: 4 (2 side platforms and 1 island platform)
- Tracks: 4

Construction
- Structure type: Underground
- Accessible: Yes

History
- Opened: Line 6: 18 August 2020 (5 years ago); Line 13: 28 June 2026 (18 days ago)

Services
Preceding station	Shenzhen Metro	Following station
Heshuikou towards Songgang	Line 6	Honghuashan towards Science Museum
Xinzhuang towards Shenzhen Bay Checkpoint	Line 13	Shangcun towards Lisonglang
Location

Gongming Square station (Chinese: 公明广场站; pinyin: Gōngmíng Guǎngchǎng Zhàn; Cantonese Yale: Gūngmìhng Gwóngchèuhng Jaahm) is an interchange station between Line 6 and Line 13 of the Shenzhen Metro. It is located in front of Gongming Square, in Gongming Subdistrict in Guangming District. The Line 6 station opened on 18 August 2020. The Line 13 station opened on 28 June 2026. The station is also the main transportation hub in the Gongming area.

== Station layout ==
The Line 6 section is arranged east-west along Songbai Road, serving as an underground level station with one basement level, sharing the same level as the Line 6 concourse. Line 6 has side platforms, while the second basement level of Line 6 has a connecting passage. Both the two concourses and platforms can be accessed via the connecting passages under the two tracks, whether within the paid or non-paid zones. Line 13 has an island platform on the fourth basement level.

G	-	Exits A-G
B1F; 6 Concourse & platforms	6 South Lobby	Ticket Machines, Customer Service
B1F; 6 Concourse & platforms	Side platform, doors will open on the right
B1F; 6 Concourse & platforms		6 towards Science Museum (Honghuashan)
B1F; 6 Concourse & platforms		6 towards Songgang (Heshuikou)
B1F; 6 Concourse & platforms	Side platform, doors will open on the right
B1F; 6 Concourse & platforms	6 North Lobby	Ticket Machines, Customer Service
B2F; Passageways	-	Passageways between North & South Lobbies, Platforms, Transfer Passage
B3F; 13 Concourse	13 Lobby	Ticket Machines, Customer Service, Station Control Room, Toilets
B4F; 13 Platforms	Platform 1	13 towards Shenzhen Bay Checkpoint (Xinzhuang)
B4F; 13 Platforms	Island platform, doors will open on the left
B4F; 13 Platforms	Platform 2	13 towards Lisonglang (Shangcun)

=== Line 6 ===
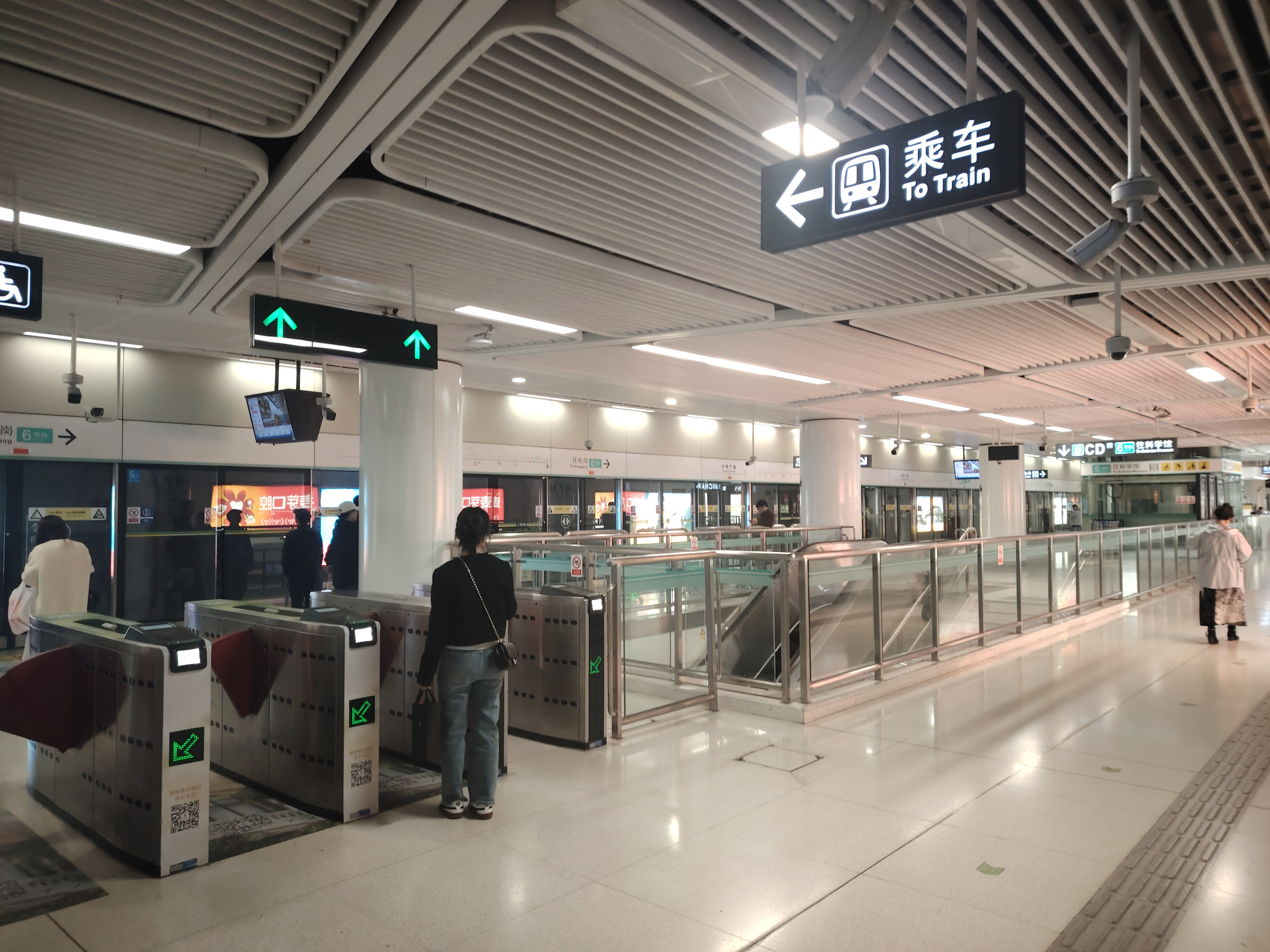
Westbound platform (towards Songgang)

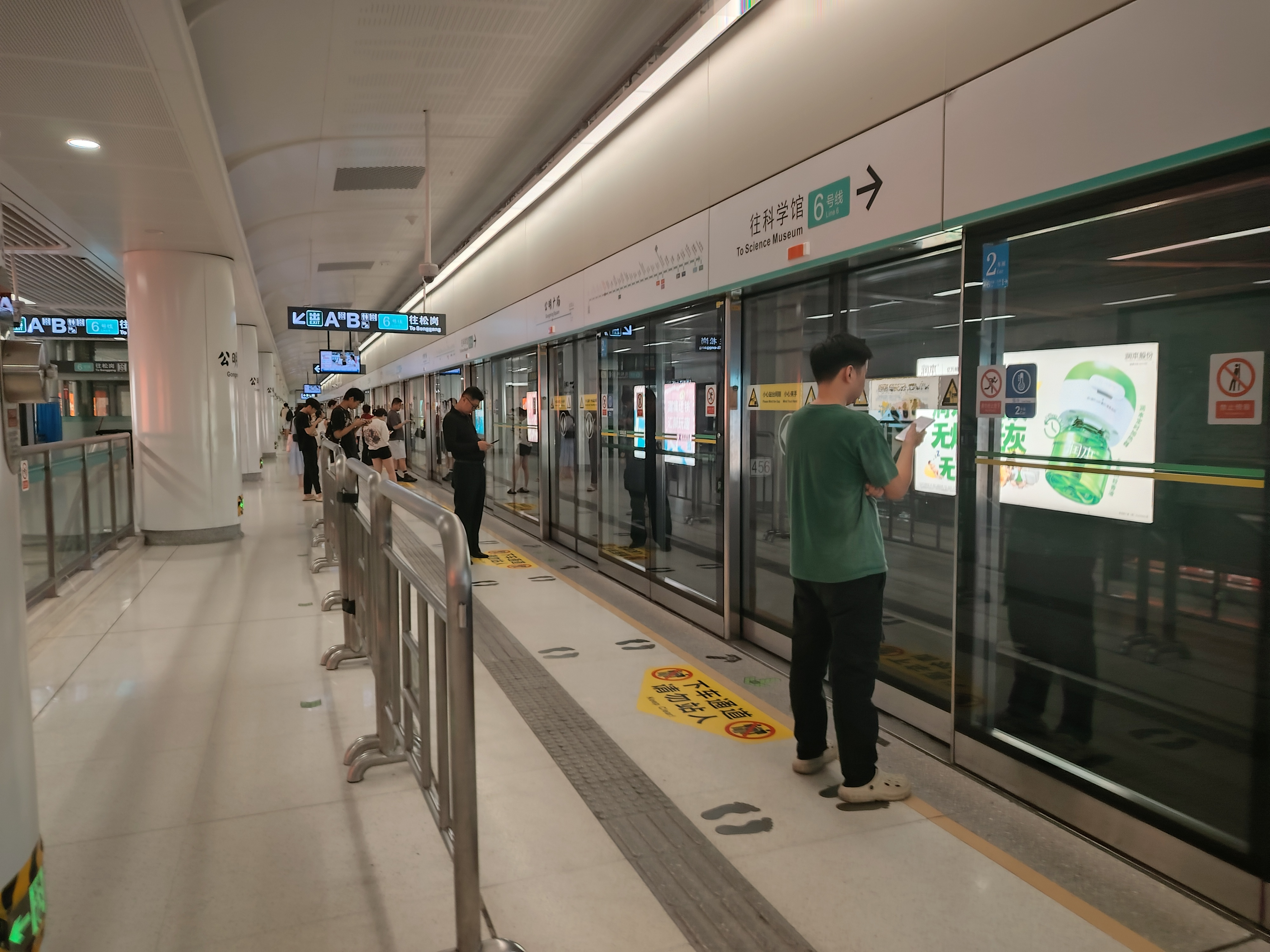
Eastbound platform (towards Science Museum)

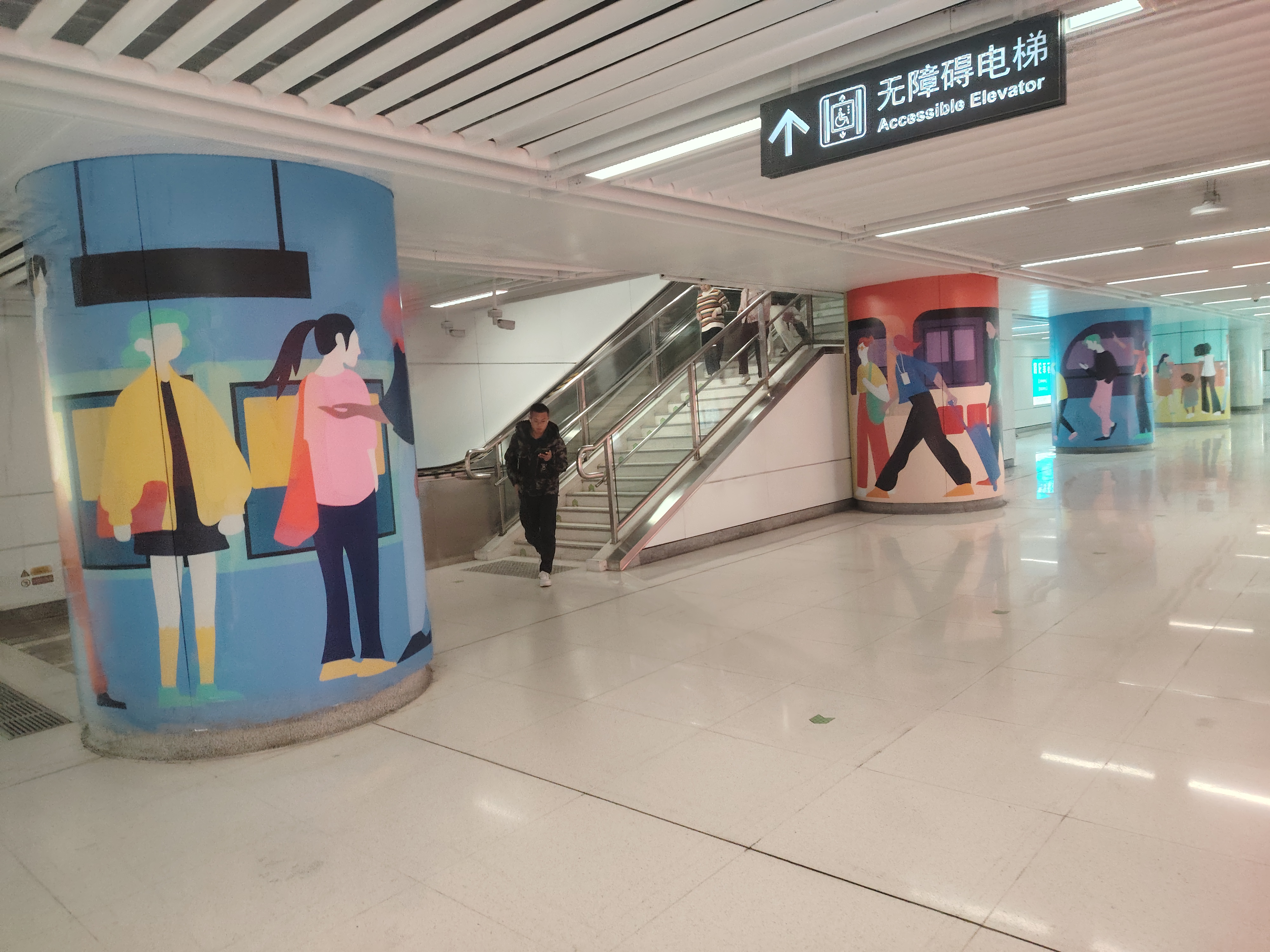
Connecting passage between the platforms with art columns

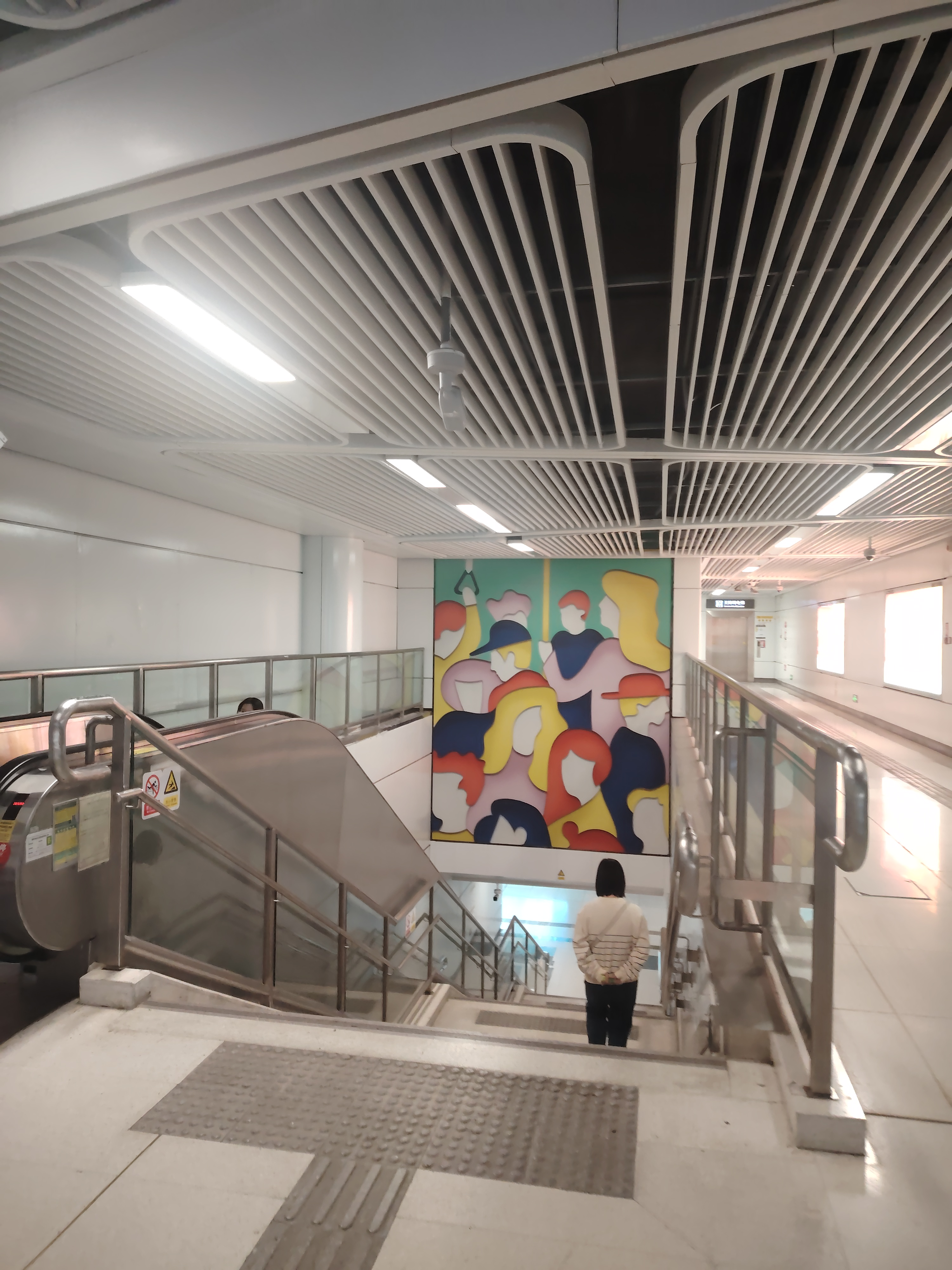
Connecting passage between the platforms with an art wall

=== Line 13 ===
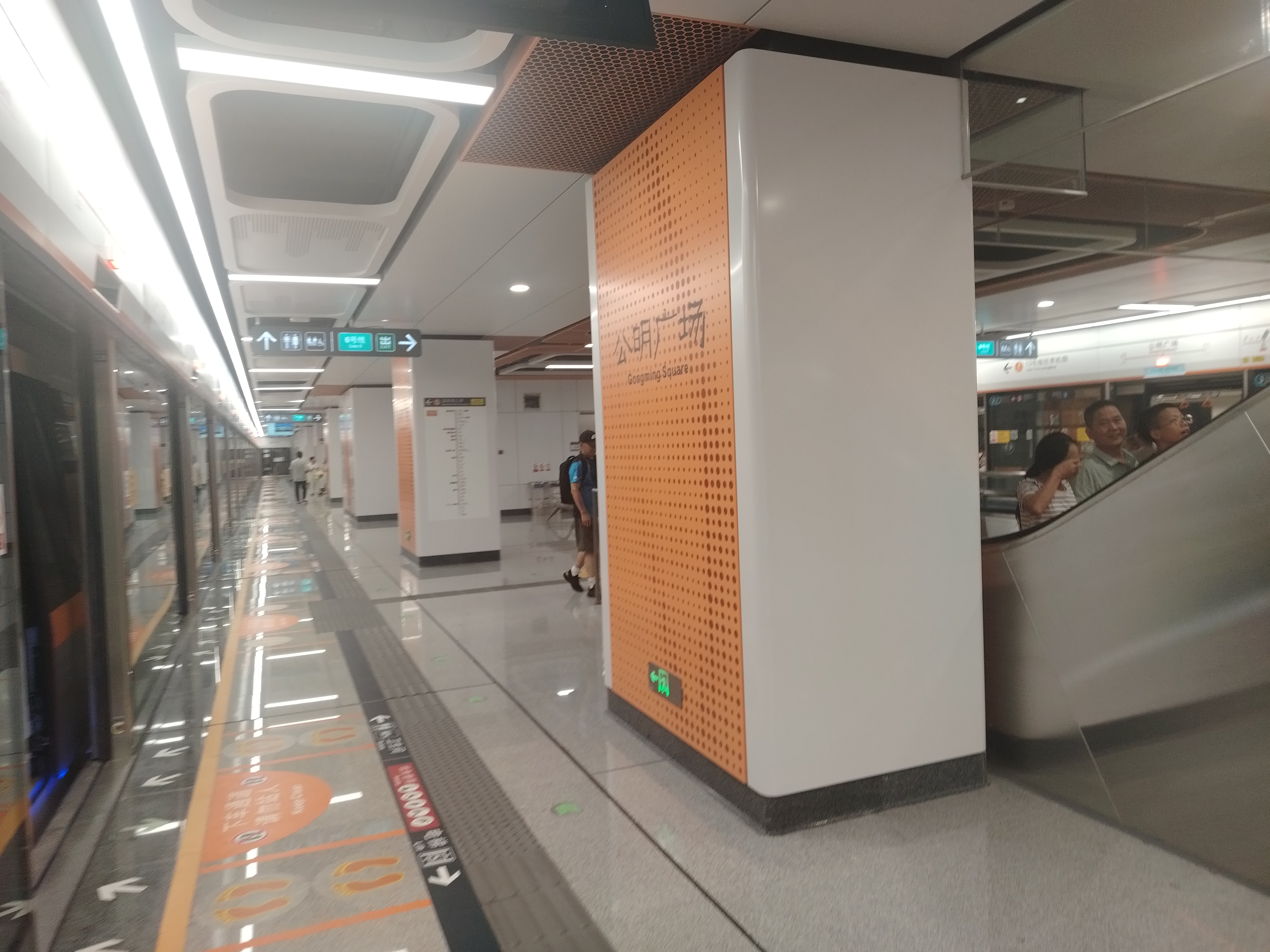
Platform calligraphy pillars

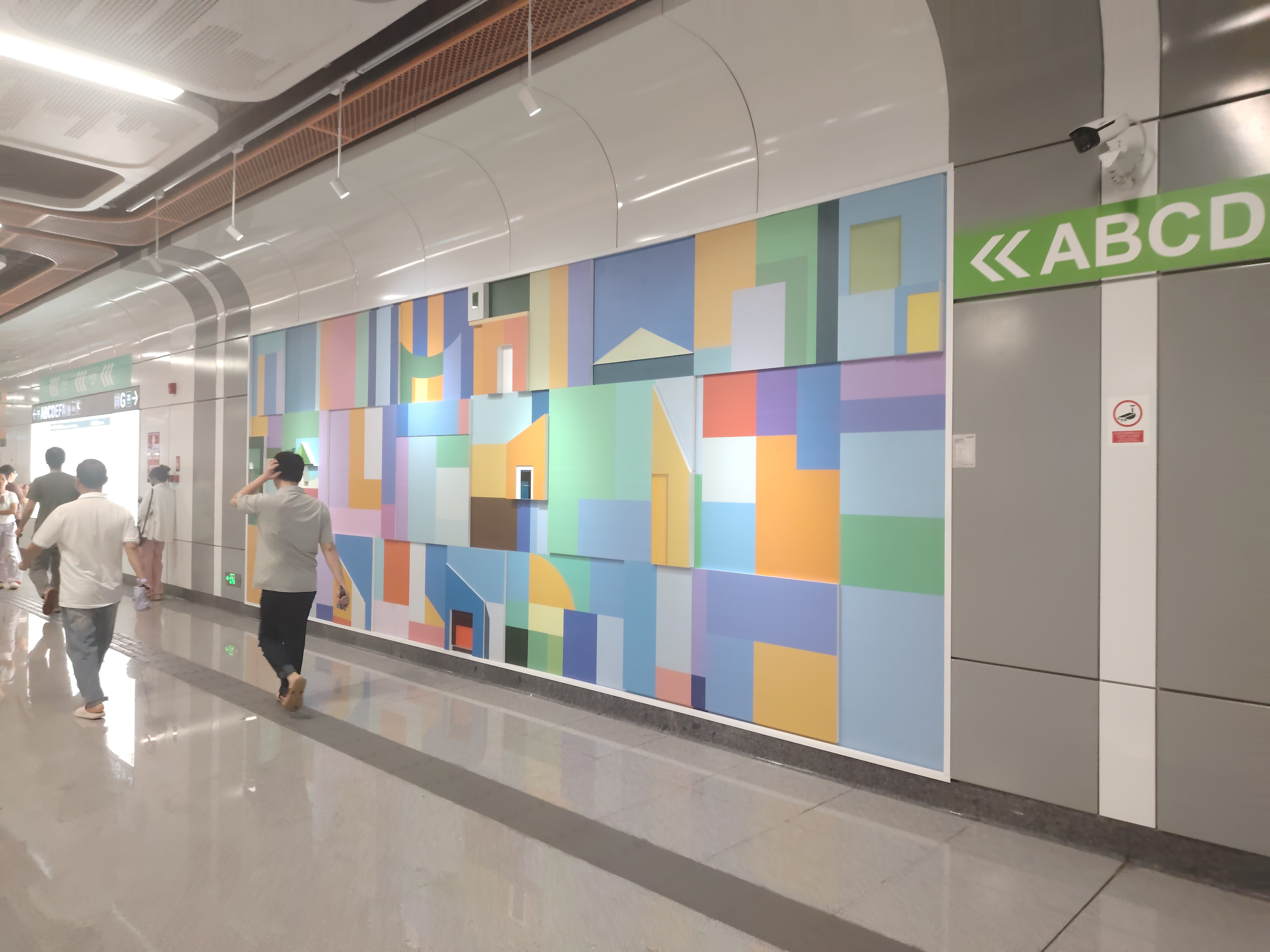
Art wall

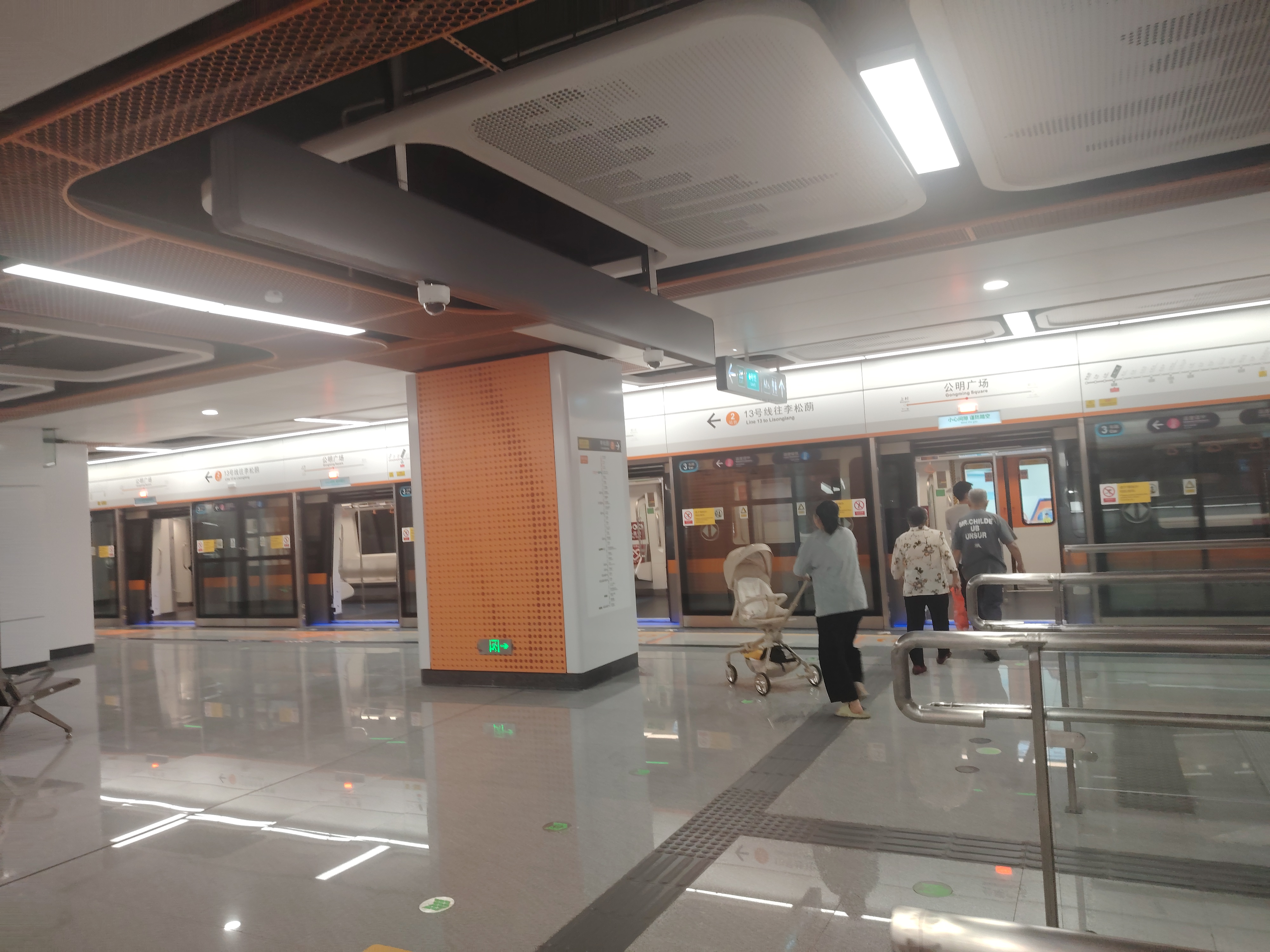
Platform 2 (towards Lisonglang)

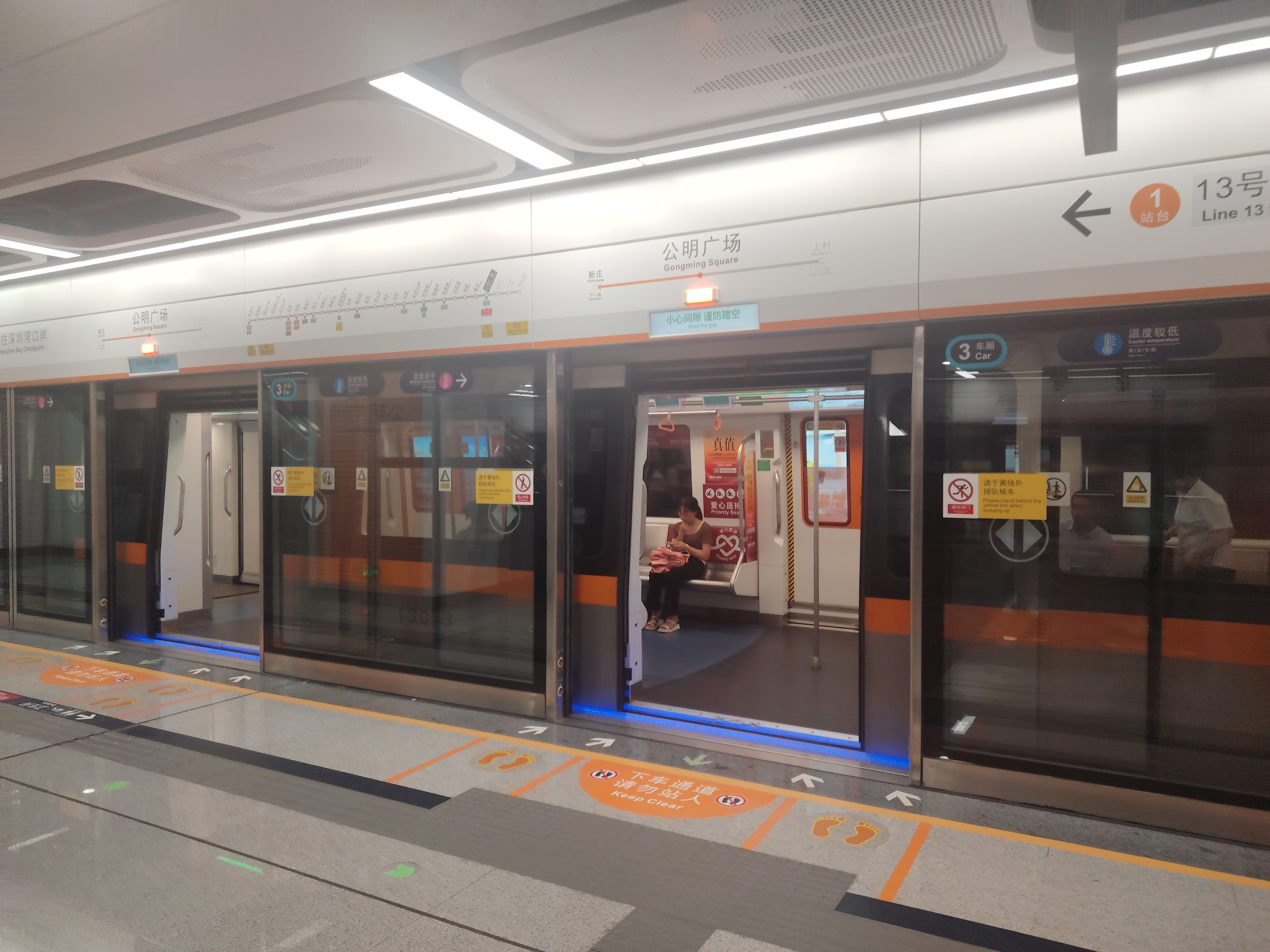
Platform 1 (towards Dongjiaotou)

=== Entrances/exits ===
The station has 7 points of entry/exit. All exits are equipped with elevators except Exit F.

- : North Side of Songbai Rd (E), Gongming Square, Fufu Garden, Baijiahua Mall, Gongming

Middle School

- : North Side of Songbai Rd (E), Sanhe Department Store, Gongming Comprehensive Market, Rainbow Mall Gongming Branch
- : South Side of Songbai Rd (W), Heshuikou Fourth Industrial Zone
- : South Side of Songbai Rd (E), Gongming Bus Station, Guangming Daqianli
- :
- : Shenzhen Guangming District No. 2 Middle School
- : Gongming Plaza, Gongming Middle School, Baijiahua Mall
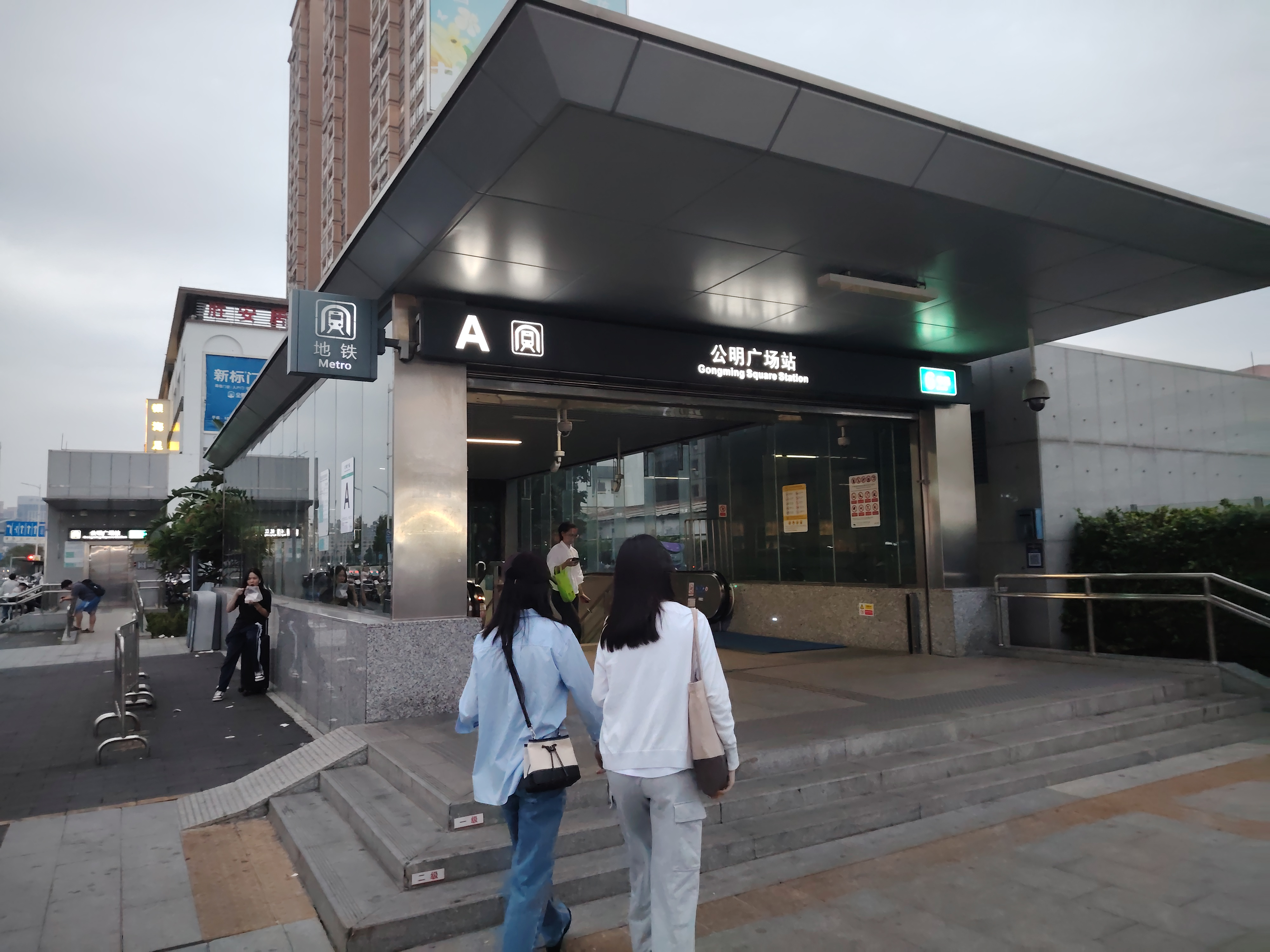
Entrance A

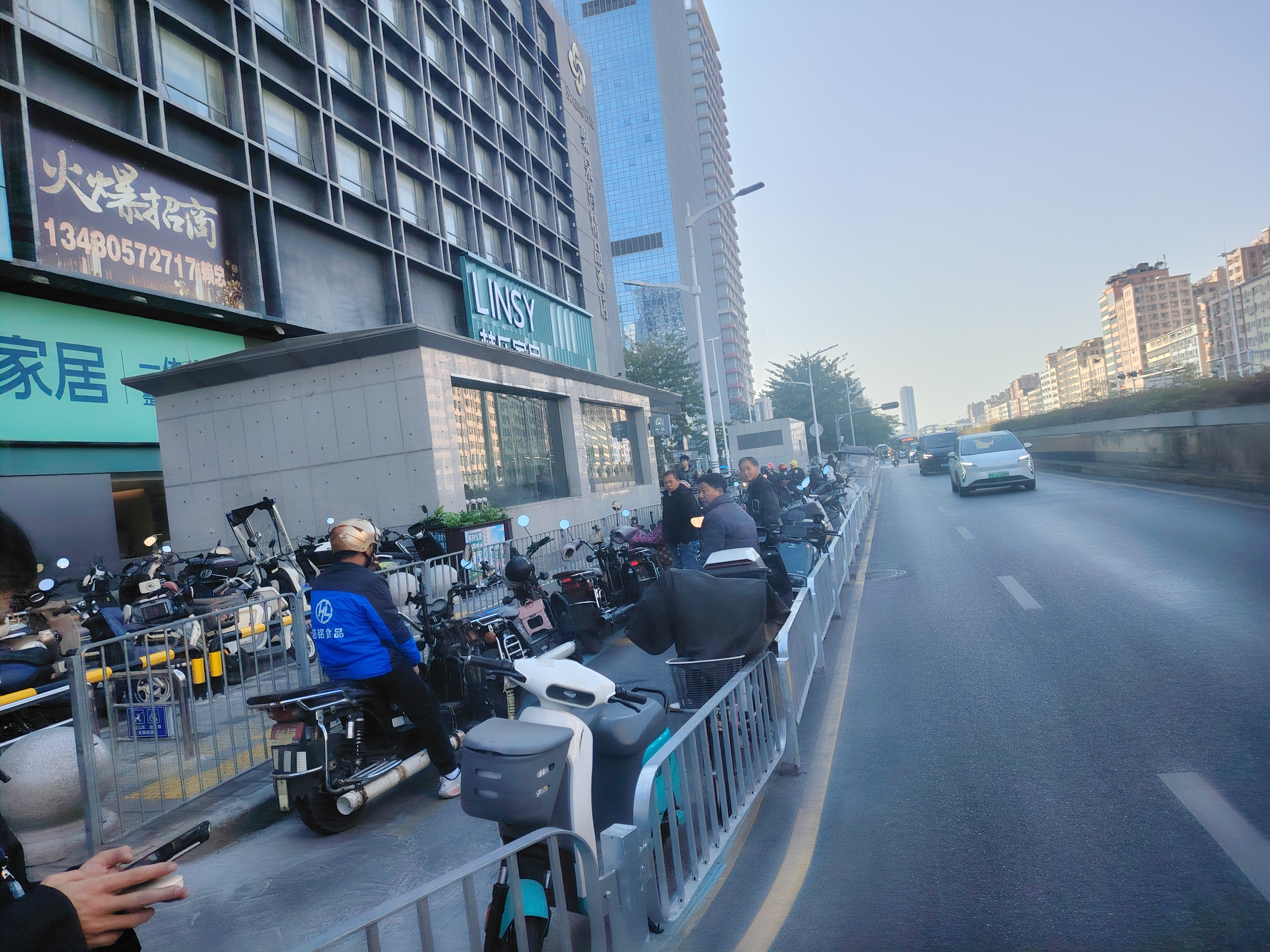
Entrance C

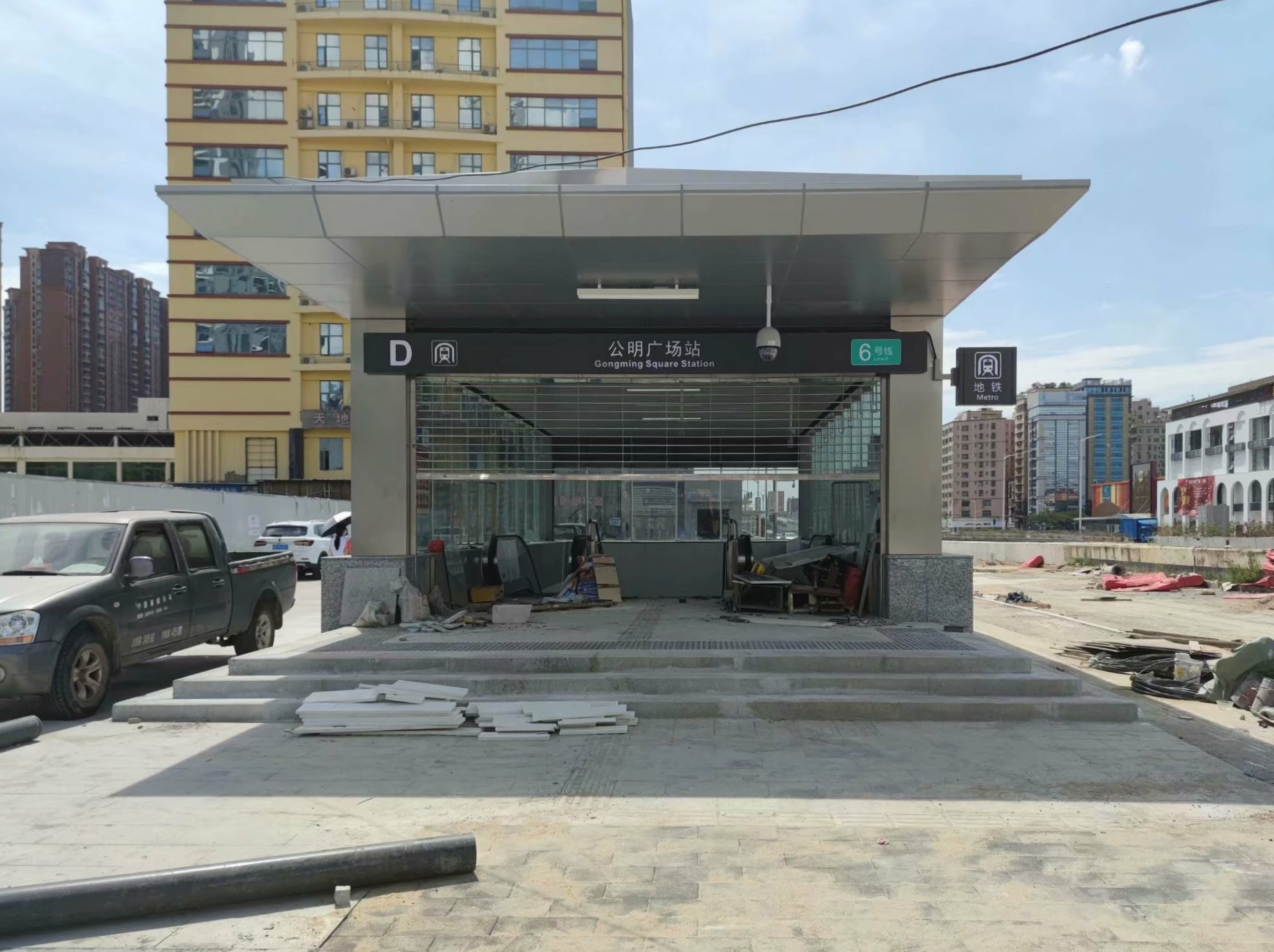
Entrance D

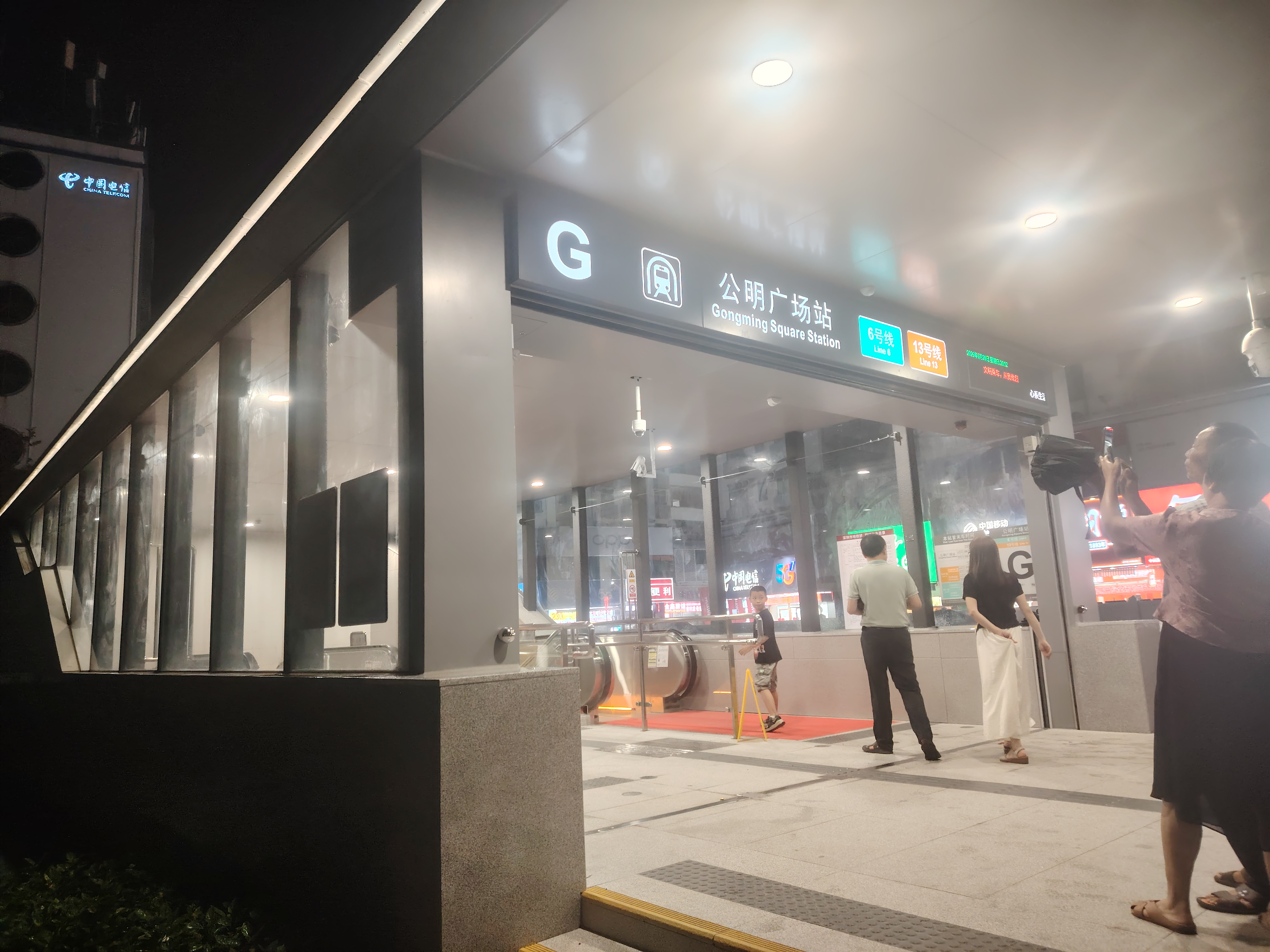
Entrance G

== History ==
The station was first proposed for construction in 2011 and began construction in 2015. It opened as part of Line 6 on 18 August 2020. The Line 13 tunnel connection to Shangcun broke through on 12 September 2023. On 28 June 2026, the Line 13 station opened with its Phase II northern extension.
