= Shangcun station =

Shenzhen Metro Line 13 station

Shangcun 上村
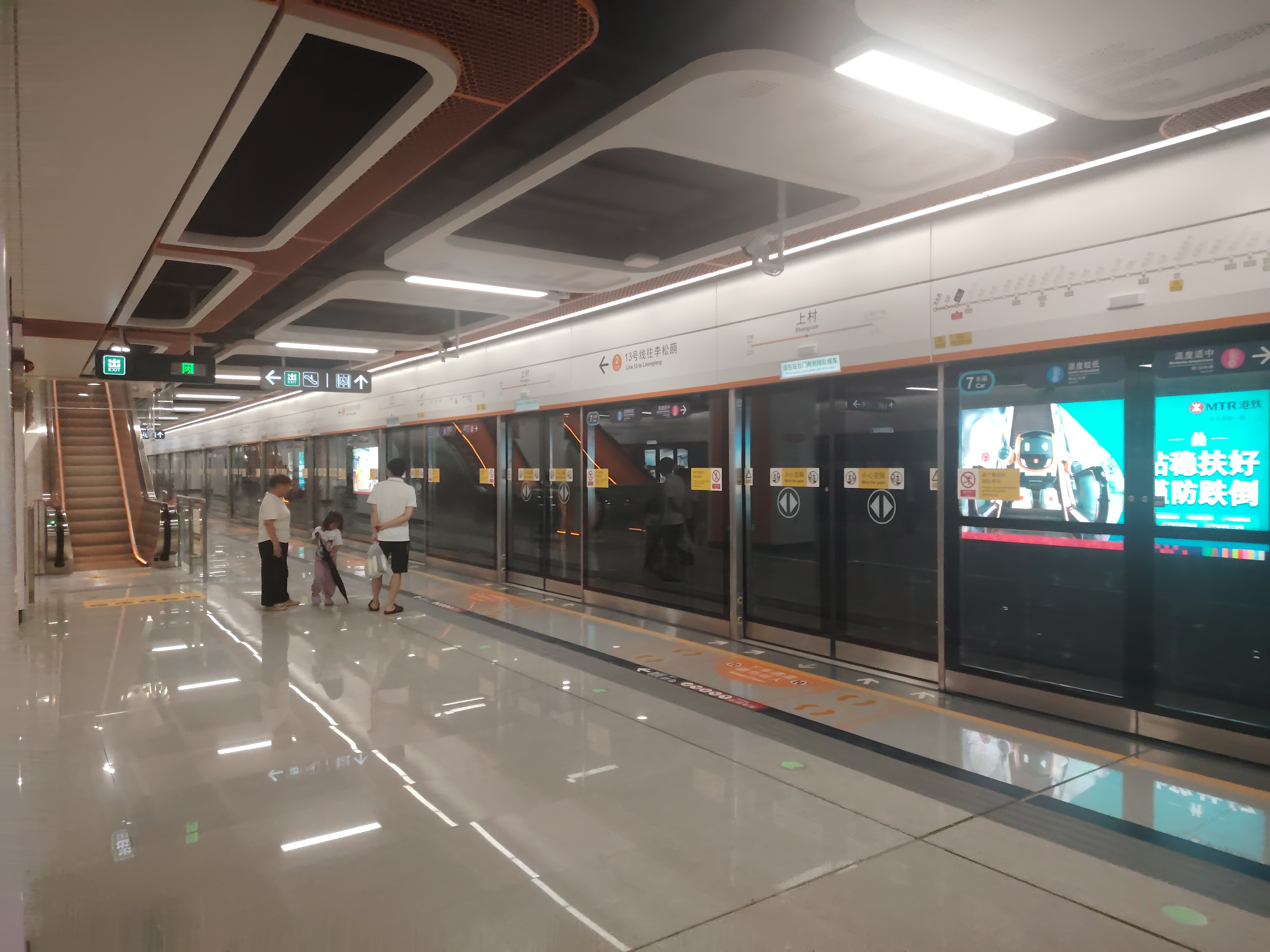
- Platform 2 (towards Lisonglang)

Chinese name
- Chinese: 上村
Transcriptions
Standard Mandarin
- Hanyu Pinyin: Shàngcūn
Yue: Cantonese
- Yale Romanization: Seuhngchyūn
- Jyutping: soeng6 cyun1

General information
- Location: Intersection of Changchun North Road (长春北路), Changchun Middle Road (长春中路) and Minsheng Avenue (民生大道), Shangcun Community; Gongming Subdistrict, Guangming District, Shenzhen, Guangdong; China
- Coordinates: 22°47′15.1″N 113°53′21.8″E
- Operated by: MTR China Railway Electrification Rail Transit (Shenzhen) Co., Ltd (MTR Rail Transit (Shenzhen) Co., Ltd. and China Railway Electrification Bureau Group Co., Ltd.)
- Line: Line 13
- Platforms: 2 (1 island platform)
- Tracks: 2

Construction
- Structure type: Underground
- Accessible: Yes

History
- Opened: 28 June 2026 (21 days ago)
- Previous names: Changchun North Road (长春北路)

Services
Preceding station	Shenzhen Metro	Following station
Gongming Square towards Shenzhen Bay Checkpoint	Line 13	Xiacun towards Lisonglang
Location

Shangcun station (Chinese: 上村站; pinyin: Shàngcūn Zhàn; Cantonese Yale: Seuhngchyūn Jaahm) is a station on Line 13 of Shenzhen Metro. It opened on 28 June 2026, and is located in Gongming Subdistrict in Guangming District.

== Station layout ==
The station is a two-level underground island platform station along Changchun Road.

G	-	Exits A, B, C
B1F; Concourse	Lobby	Ticket Machines, Customer Service, Shops, Station Control Room
B2F; Platforms	Platform 1	13 towards Shenzhen Bay Checkpoint (Gongming Square)
B2F; Platforms	Island platform, doors will open on the left
B2F; Platforms	Platform 2	13 towards Lisonglang (Xiacun)

=== Gallery ===
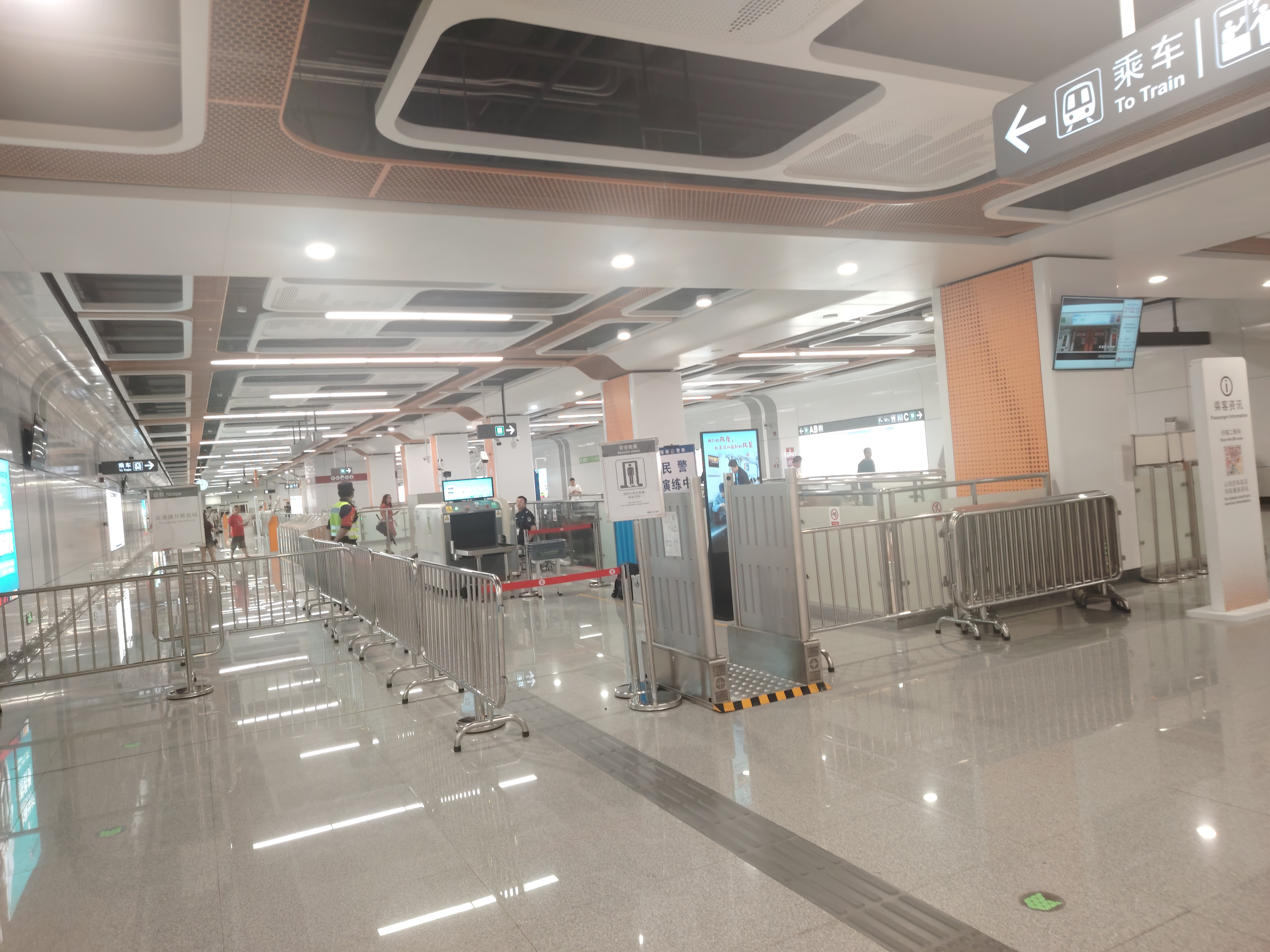
Concourse

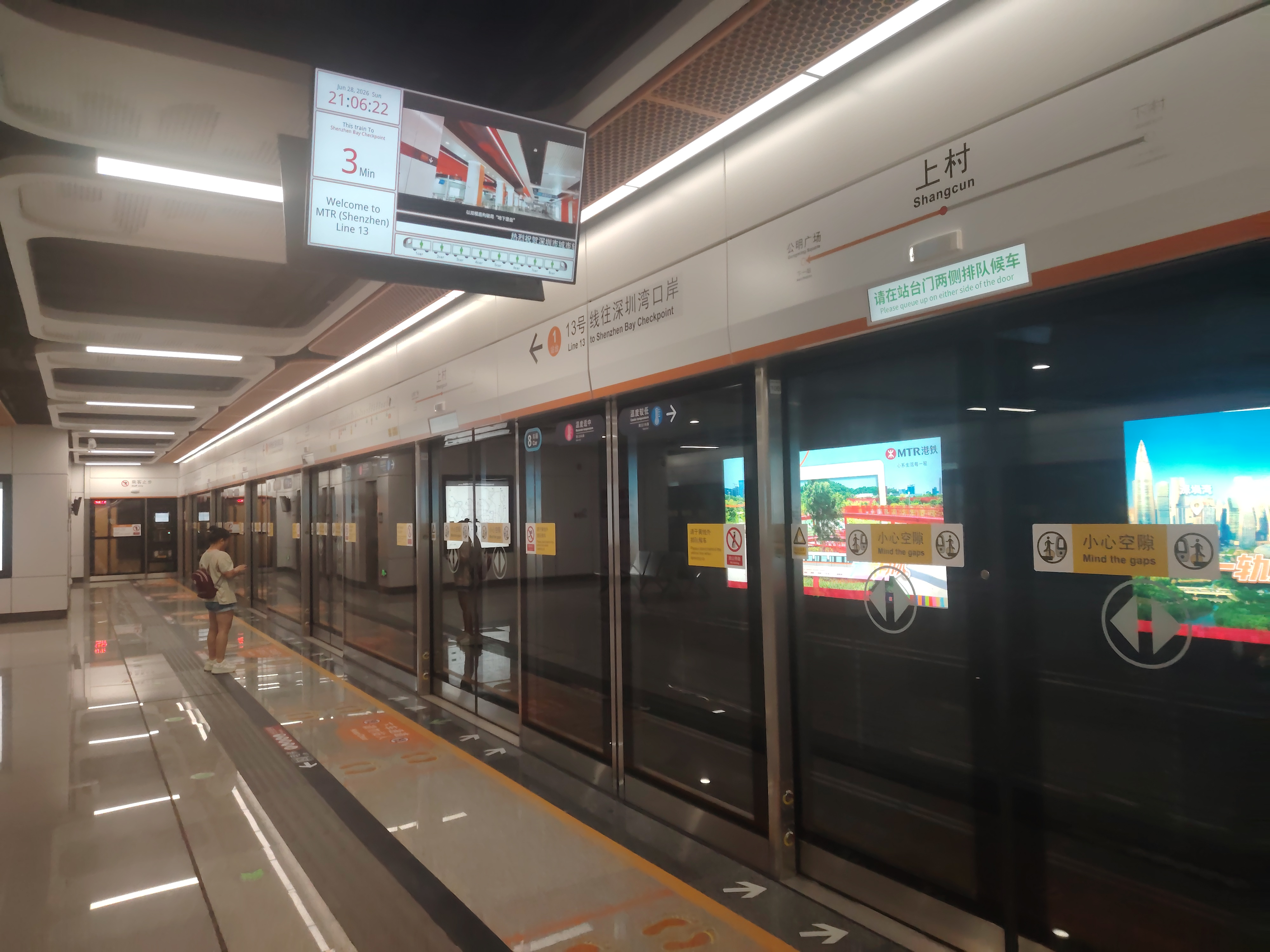
Platform 1

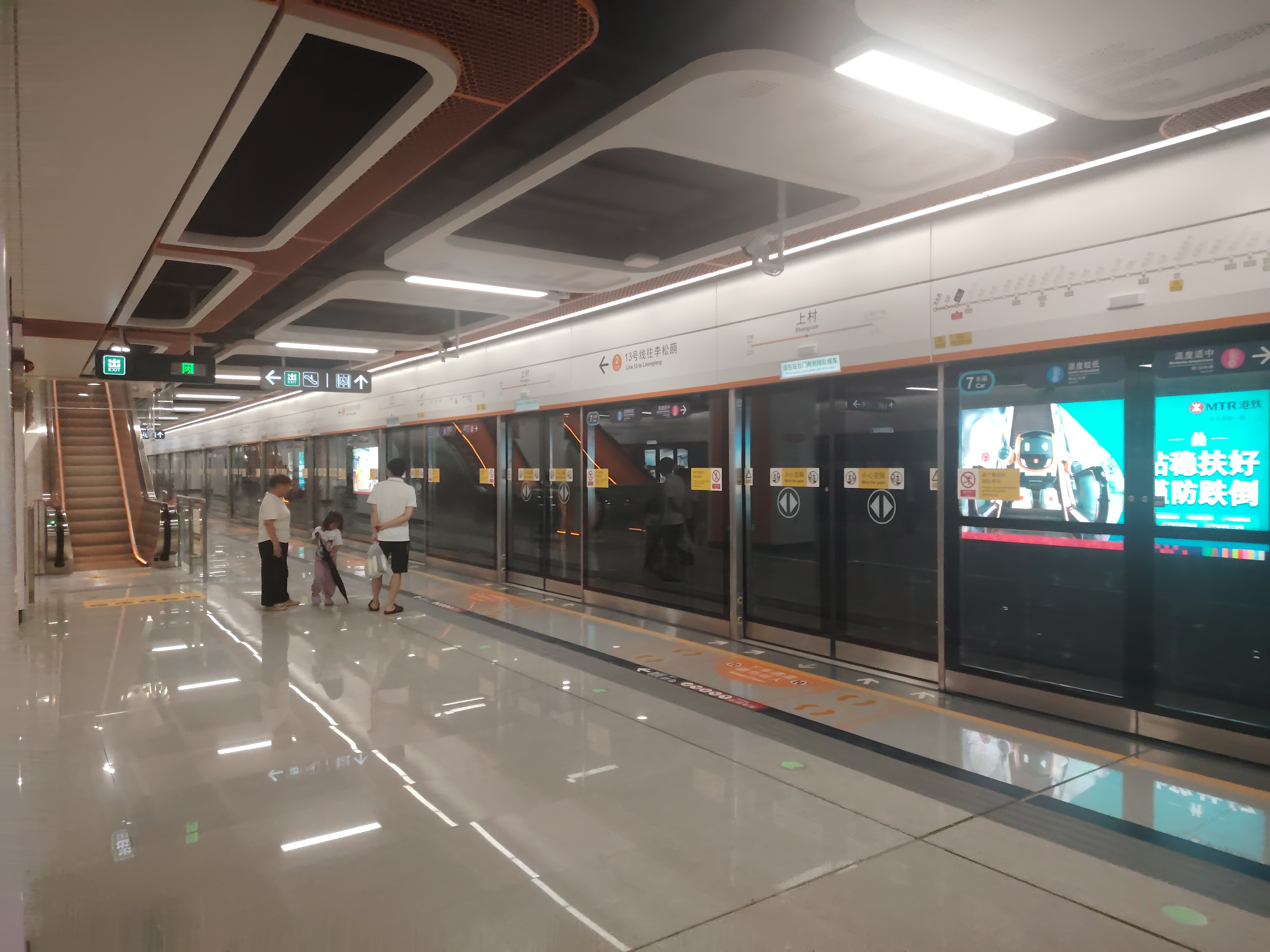
Platform 2

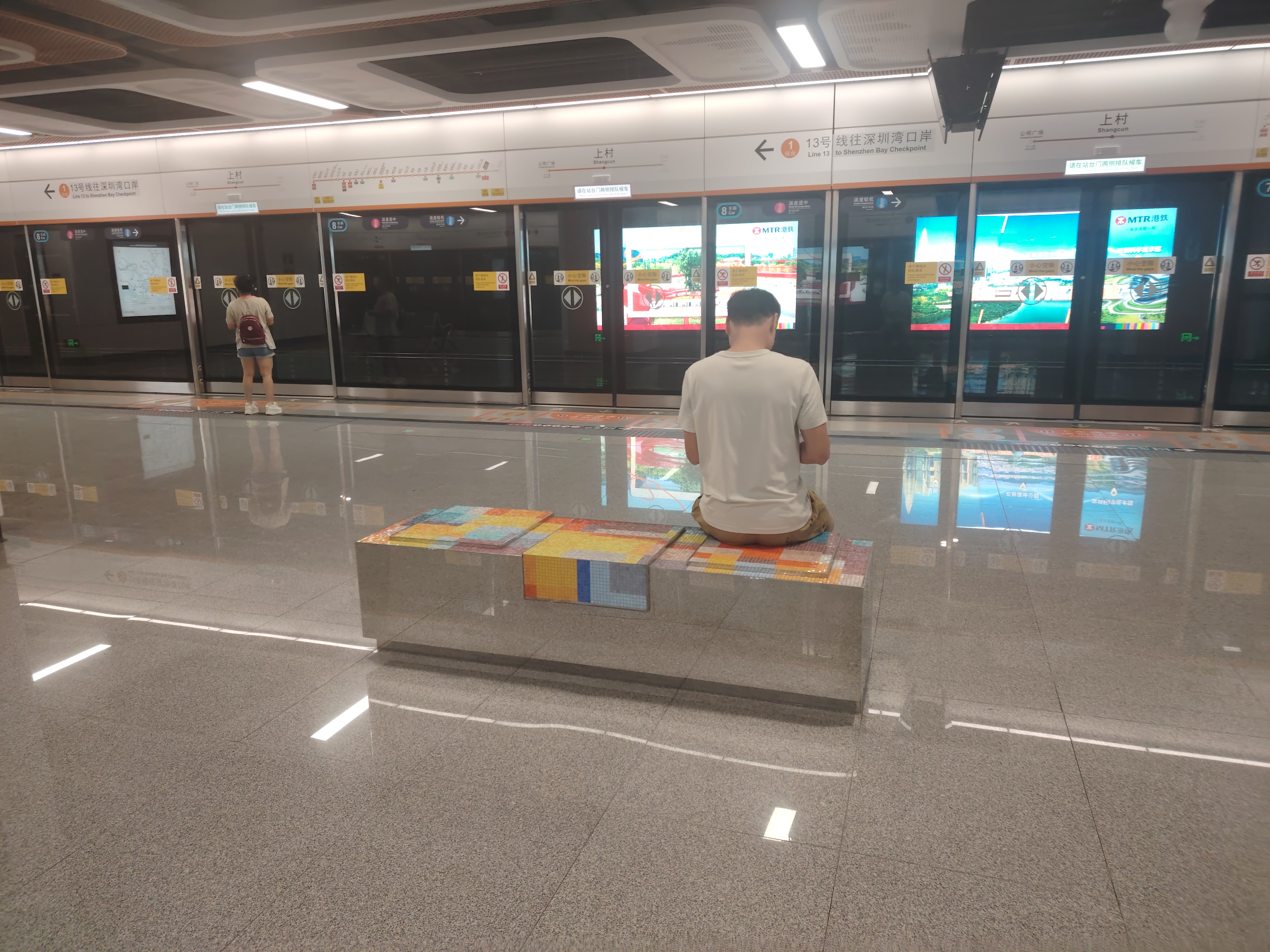
Colorful mosaic art benches

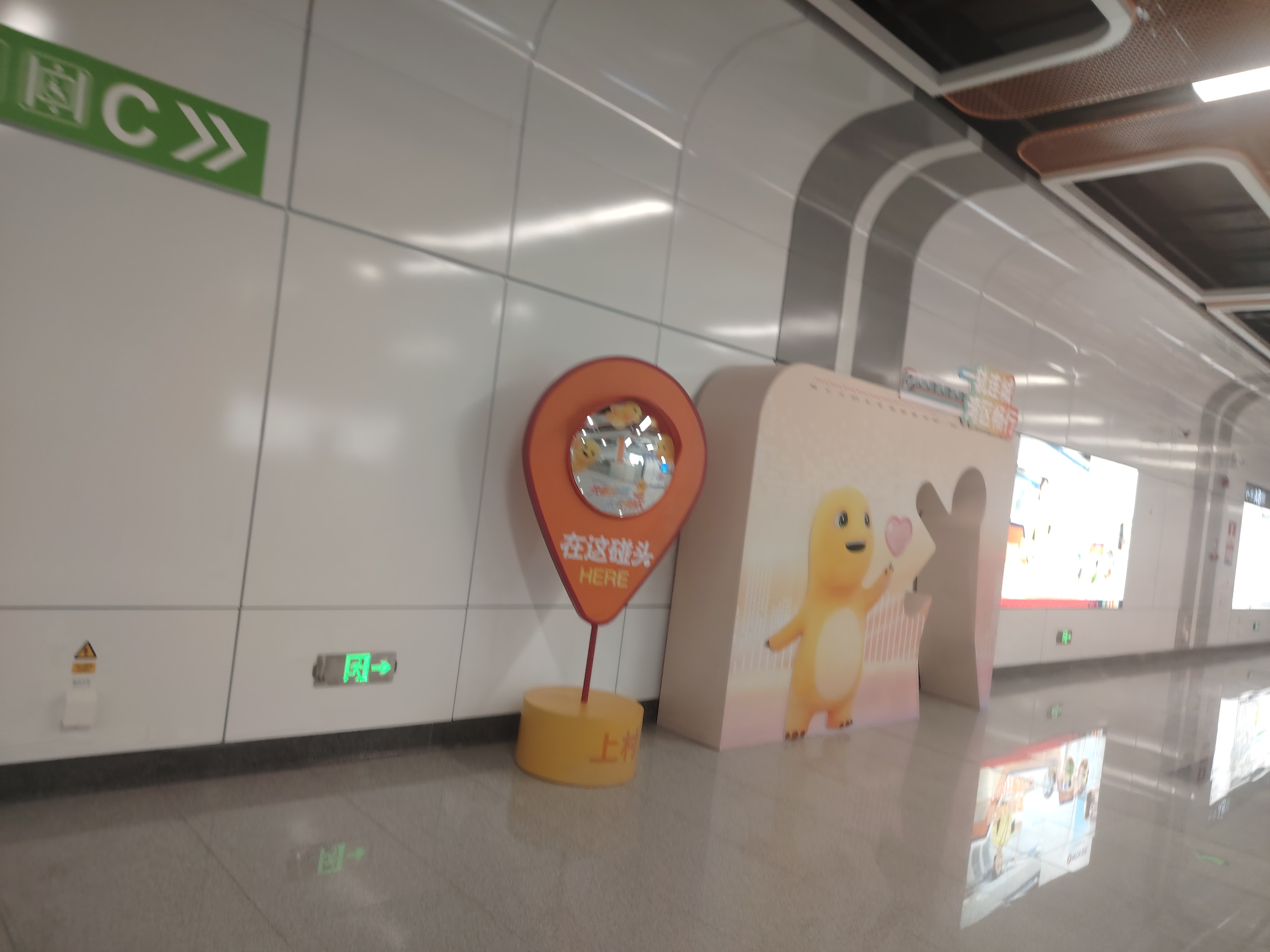
Limited-time Milk Dragon interactive installation

=== Entrances/exits ===
The station has 3 points of entry/exit. Exit A is equipped with an elevator, and Exit C has a toilet.

- : Changchun North Road, Minsheng Avenue, Shuibei Upper Village, Yuanshanwei Village, Shangcun Community Police Office
- : Changchun North Road, Minsheng Avenue, Yuanshan Walled Village, Gongming Police Station, Gongming No. 2 Primary School
- : Changchun Middle Road, Minsheng Avenue, Changchun Garden, Rainbow Department Store Gongming Store, Gongming Middle School
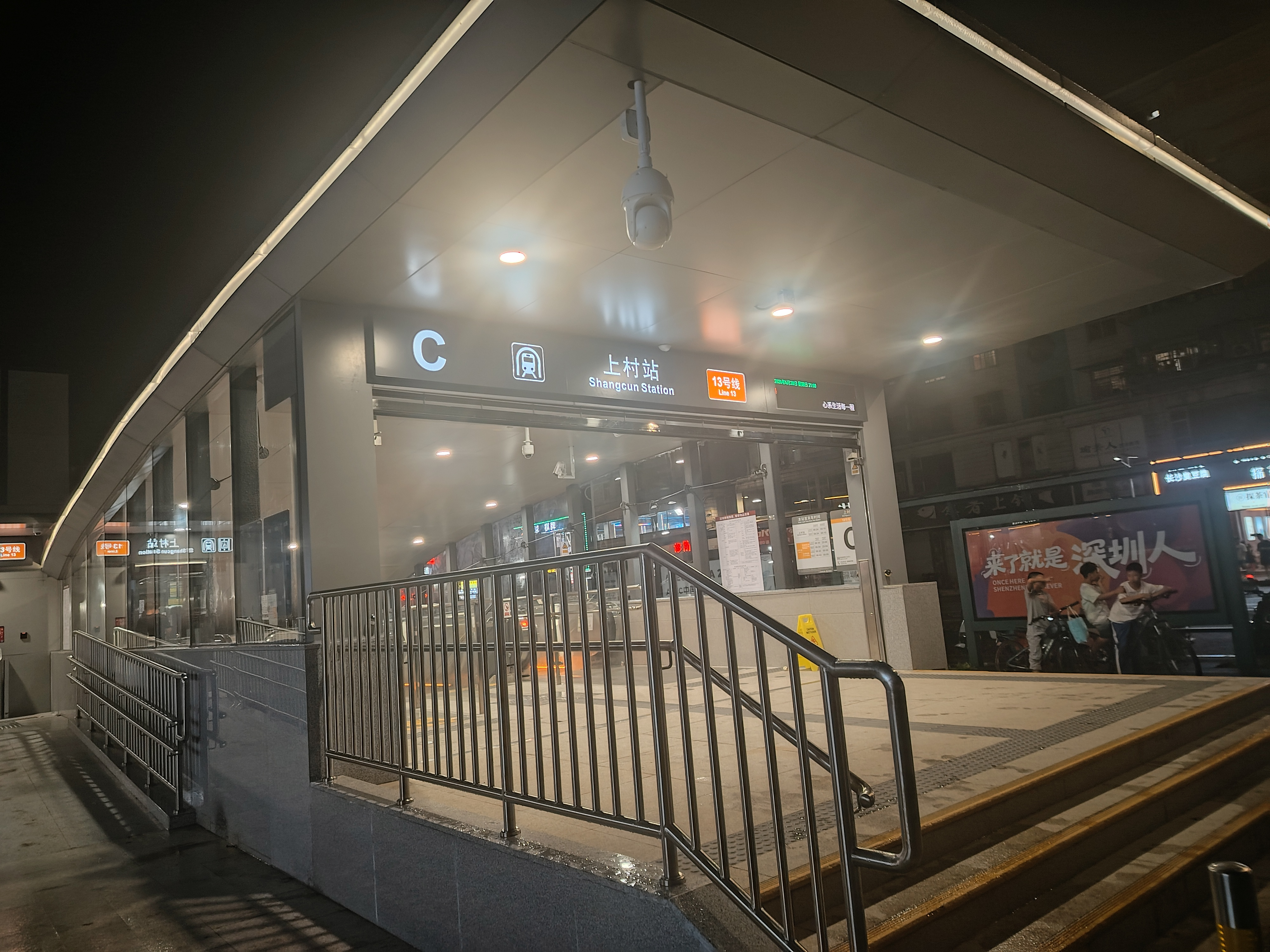
Entrance C

== History ==
During construction, the station was called Changchun North Road station, and it topped out on 17 January 2023. The tunnel connection to Gongming Square broke through on 12 September the same year.

In April 2024, the naming convention for the station as Shangcun station in the "Shenzhen Rail Transit Phase IV Adjustment Project" issued by the Shenzhen Municipal Planning and Natural Resources Bureau was approved. The term "Shangcun" originates from Gongming's "Shuibei Upper Village." After the Land Reform Movement in 1953, the original Shuibei Village was divided by a canal: the east side of the canal was called Shuibei Upper Village, the west side was Shuibei Lower Village, which later simplified to Shangcun and Xiacun.

The station opened as part of Line 13 Phase II northern extension on 28 June 2026.
