= Honghuashan station =

Metro station in Shenzhen, China

Coordinates: 22°32′58″N 114°7′22″E

Honghuashan 红花山
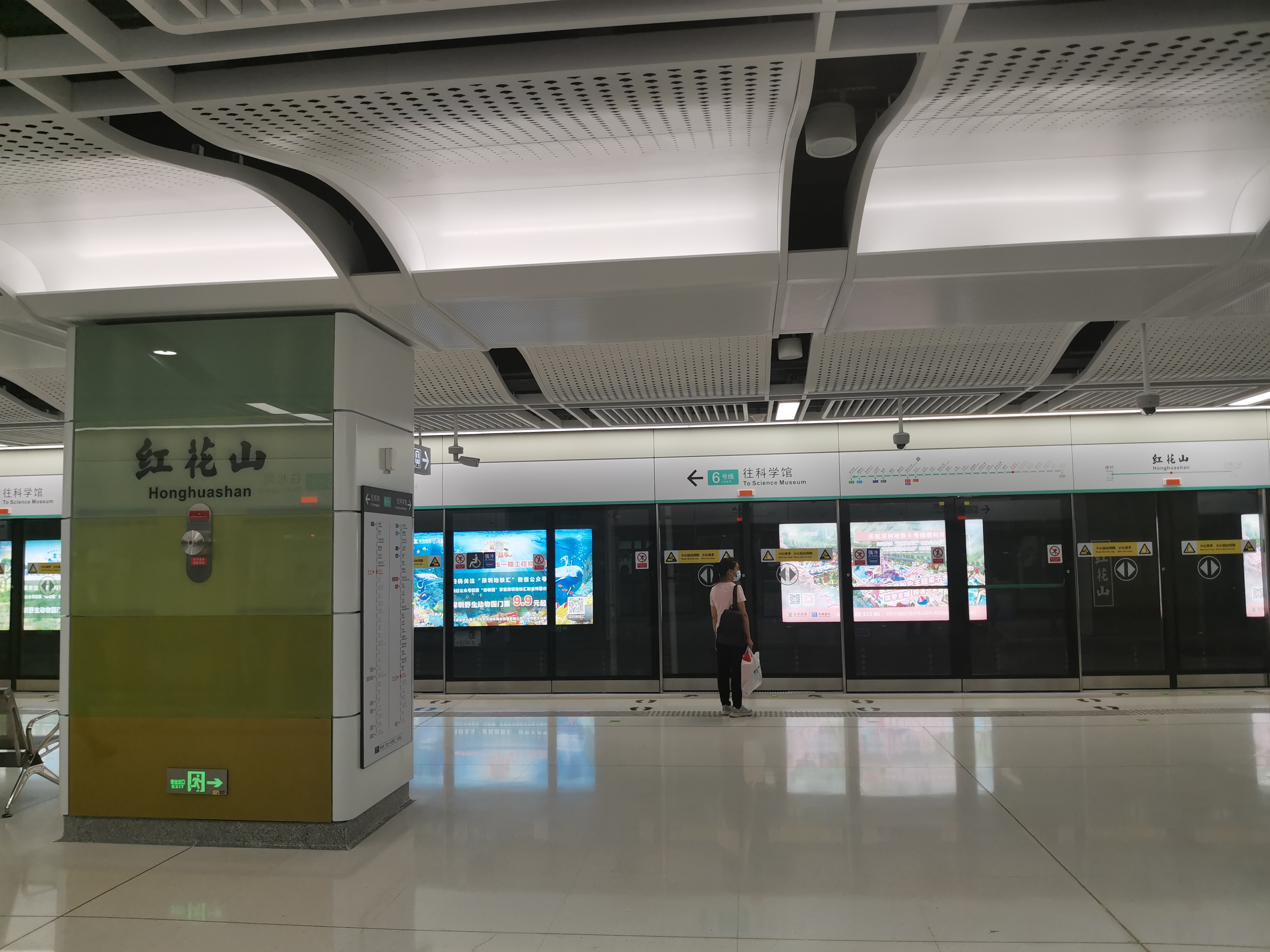

General information
- Location: Guangming District, Shenzhen, Guangdong; China
- Operated by: SZMC (Shenzhen Metro Group)
- Line(s): Line 6
- Platforms: 2 (1 island platform)
- Tracks: 2

Construction
- Structure type: Underground
- Accessible: Yes

History
- Opened: 18 August 2020

Services
| Preceding station | Shenzhen Metro | Following station |
|---|---|---|
| Gongming Square towards Songgang | Line 6 | Loucun towards Science Museum |

Honghuashan station (Chinese: 红花山站; pinyin: Hónghuāshān Zhàn) is a station on Line 6 of the Shenzhen Metro. It opened on 18 August 2020.

== Station layout ==
| G | - | Exit |
| B1F; Concourse | Lobby | Customer Service, Shops, Vending machines, ATMs |
| B2F; Platforms | Platform | ← Line 6 towards Science Museum (Loucun) |
| B2F; Platforms | Island platform, doors will open on the left |
| B2F; Platforms | Platform | → Line 6 towards Songgang (Gongming Square) → |

== Exits ==
| Exit | | Destination |
|---|---|---|
| Exit A | A1 | Gong Ming Chinese English School |
| Exit A | A2 | Gong Ming Chinese English School |
| Exit B | B1 | Yong Jing Cheng |
| Exit B | B2 | Yong Jing Cheng |
| Exit C | | Yong Jing Cheng |
| Exit D | | Hong Hua Shan Sports Center |
| Exit E | E1 | Hong Fa Mei Yu |
| Exit E | E2 | Hong Fa Mei Yu |
