= Loucun station =

Metro station in Shenzhen, China

Loucun 楼村
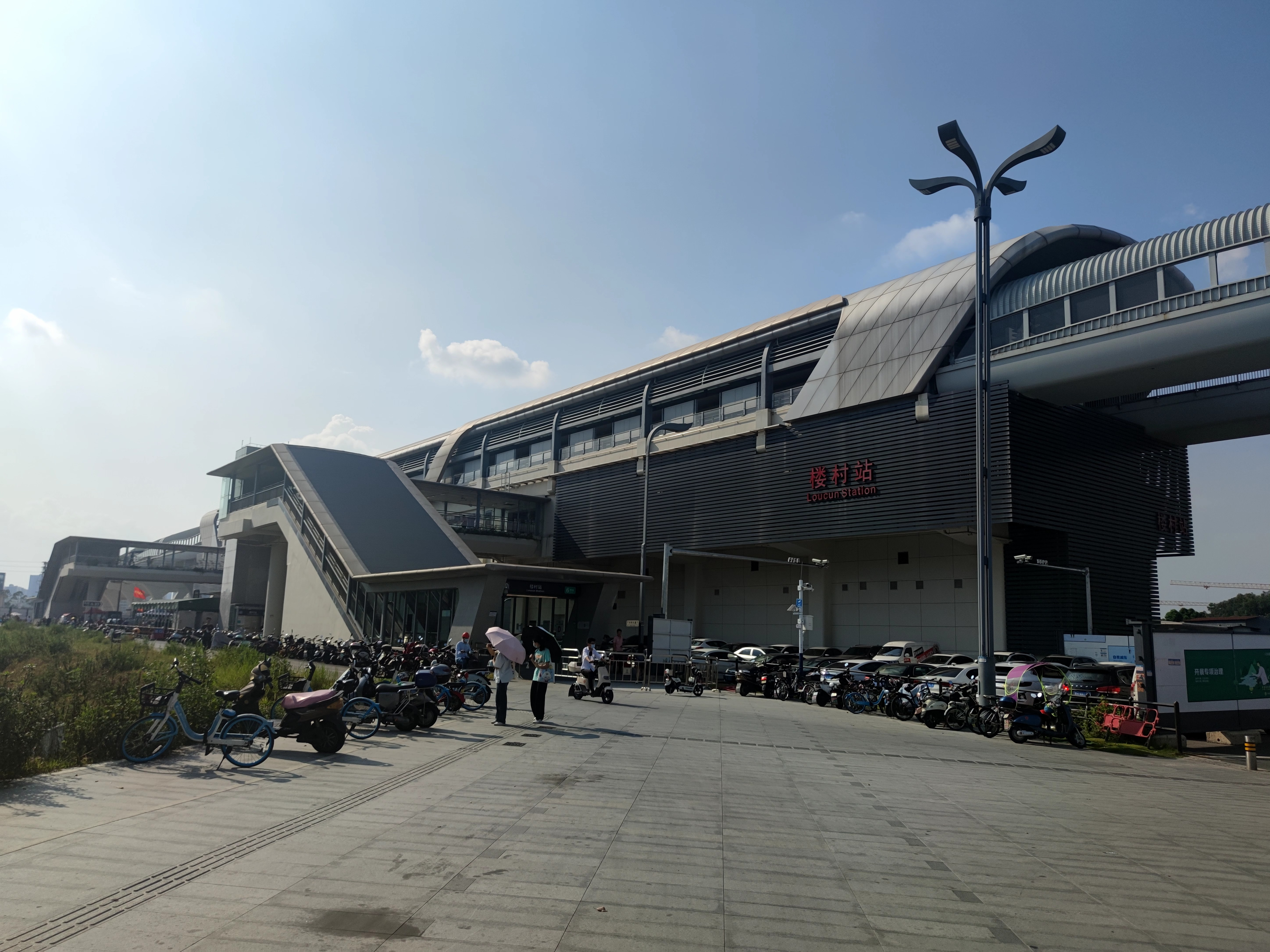
- Exterior

General information
- Location: Guangming District, Shenzhen, Guangdong; China
- Operated by: SZMC (Shenzhen Metro Group)
- Line: Line 6
- Platforms: 2 (1 island platform)
- Tracks: 2

Construction
- Structure type: Elevated
- Accessible: Yes

History
- Opened: 18 August 2020

Services
Preceding station	Shenzhen Metro	Following station
Honghuashan towards Songgang	Line 6	Science Park towards Science Museum
Location

Loucun station (Chinese: 楼村站; pinyin: Lóucūn Zhàn) is a station on Line 6 of the Shenzhen Metro. It opened on 18 August 2020.

== Station layout ==
3F; Platforms	Platform	← Line 6 towards Science Museum (Science Park)
3F; Platforms	Island platform, doors will open on the left
3F; Platforms	Platform	→ Line 6 towards Songgang (Honghuashan) →
2F; Concourse	Lobby	Customer Service, Shops, Vending machines, ATMs
G	-	Exit

== Exits ==
Exit	Destination
Exit A	
Exit B	Louming Road
Exit C	Louming Road
Exit D	
