= Heshuikou station =

Metro station in Shenzhen, Guangdong, China

Heshuikou 合水口
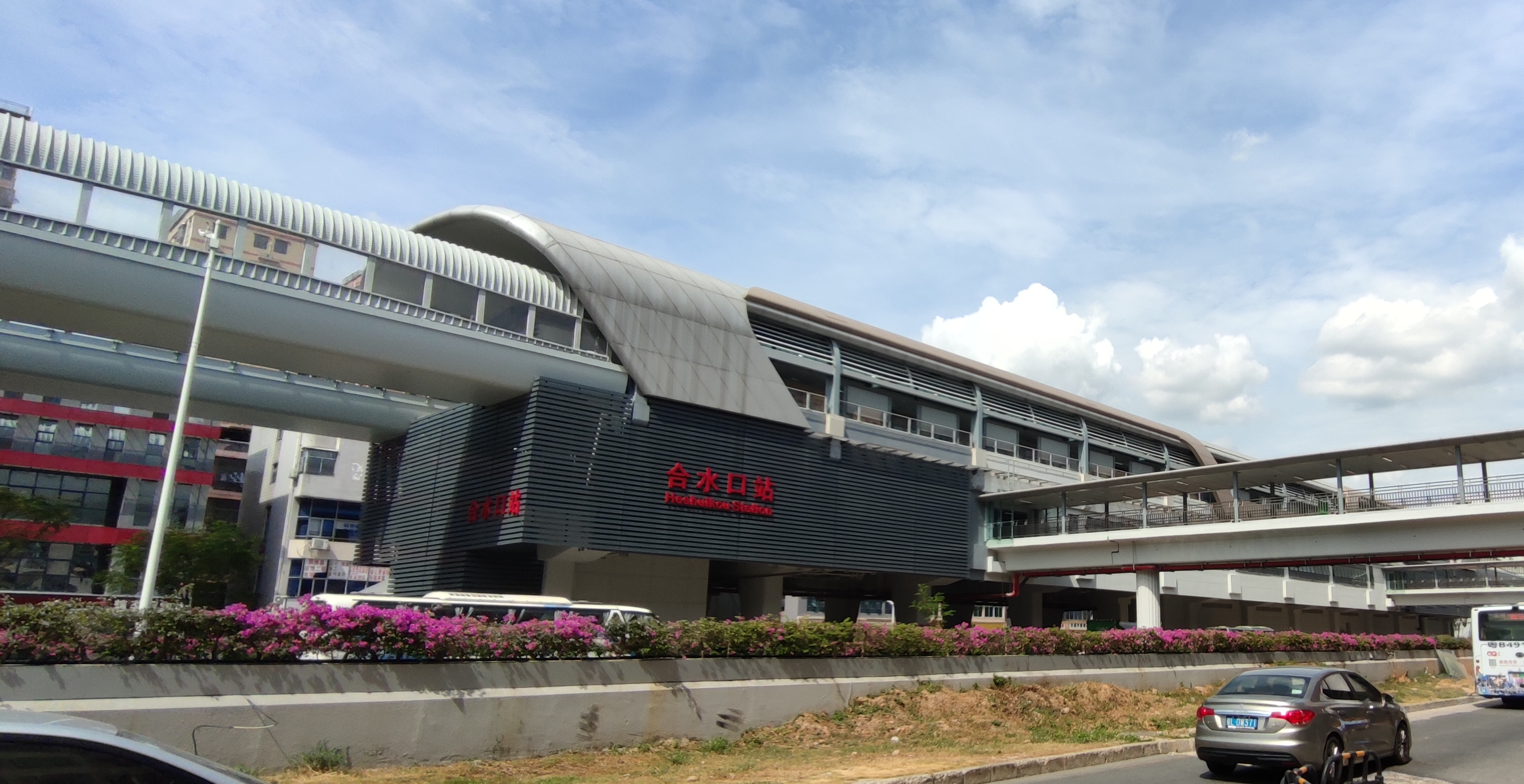

General information
- Location: Guangming District, Shenzhen, Guangdong; China
- Operated by: SZMC (Shenzhen Metro Group)
- Line: Line 6
- Platforms: 2 (1 island platform)
- Tracks: 2

Construction
- Structure type: Elevated
- Accessible: Yes

History
- Opened: 18 August 2020

Services
Preceding station	Shenzhen Metro	Following station
Shutianpu towards Songgang	Line 6	Gongming Square towards Science Museum
Location

Heshuikou station (Chinese: 合水口站; pinyin: Héshuǐkǒu Zhàn) is a station on Line 6 of the Shenzhen Metro. It opened on 18 August 2020.

== Station layout ==
3F; Platforms	Platform	← Line 6 towards Science Museum (Gongming Square)
3F; Platforms	Island platform, doors will open on the left
3F; Platforms	Platform	→ Line 6 towards Songgang (Shutianpu) →
2F; Concourse	Lobby	Customer Service, Shops, Vending machines, ATMs
G	-	Exit

== Exits ==
Exit	Destination
Exit A	He Shui Kou Community Party and Mass Service Center, He Shui Kou Cultural Square, He Shui Kou Library, He Shui Kou Village, North side of Songbai Road (E)
Exit B	North side of Songbai Road (W), Guangming Cultural City
Exit C	South side of Songbai Road (W), Hongfa Jiaju, Ma Tian Primary School, Baotian Hospital
Exit D	Maishantou Community Health Service Center, South side of Songbai Road (E)
