= Xiacun station =

Shenzhen Metro Line 13 station

Xiacun 下村
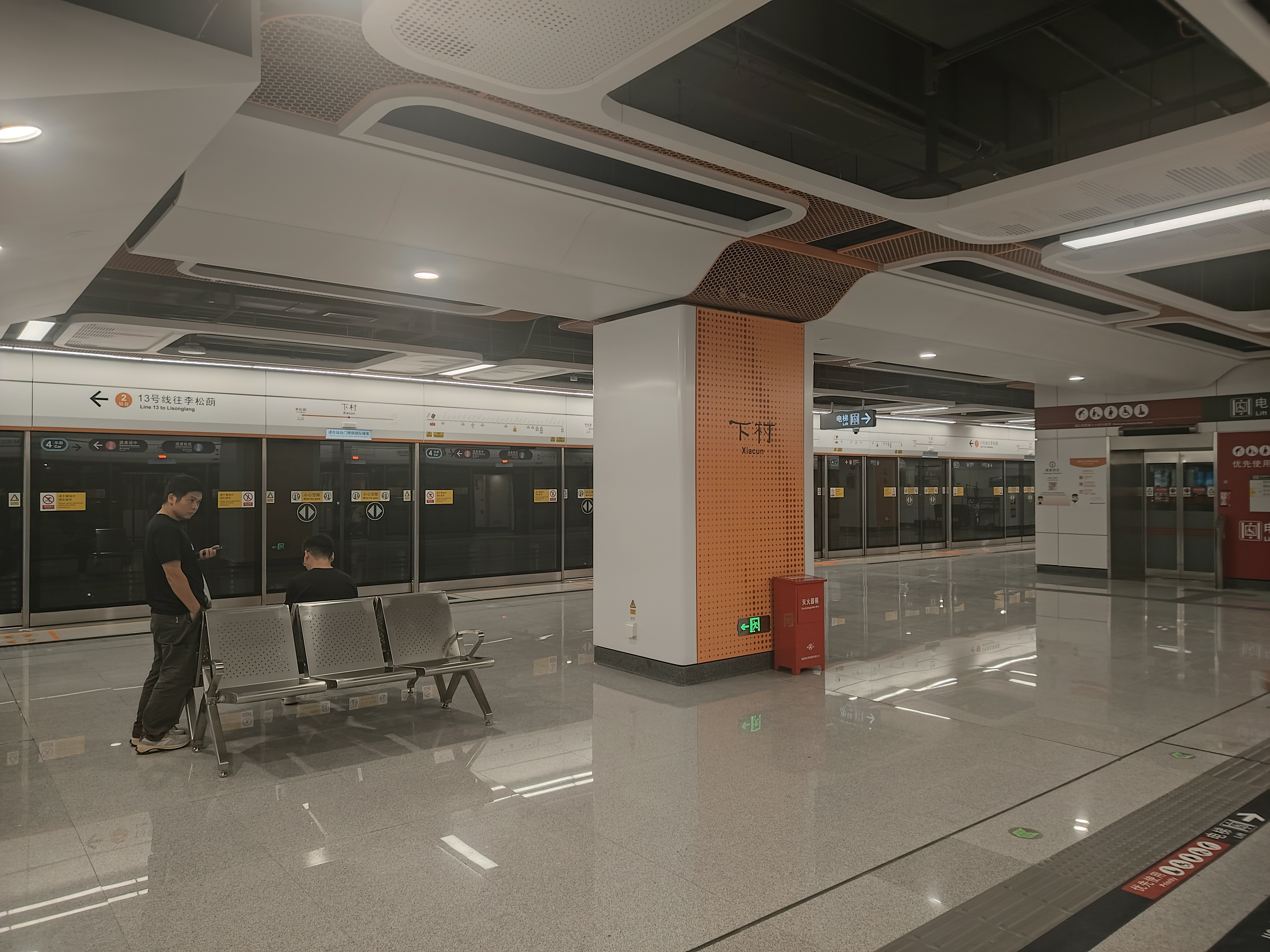
- Platform

Chinese name
- Chinese: 下村
Transcriptions
Standard Mandarin
- Hanyu Pinyin: Xiàcūn
Yue: Cantonese
- Yale Romanization: Hahchyūn
- Jyutping: haa6 cyun1

General information
- Location: Shuibin Road (水滨路); Gongming Subdistrict, Guangming District, Shenzhen, Guangdong; China
- Coordinates: 22°47′47″N 113°53′23″E
- Operated by: MTR China Railway Electrification Rail Transit (Shenzhen) Co., Ltd (MTR Rail Transit (Shenzhen) Co., Ltd. and China Railway Electrification Bureau Group Co., Ltd.)
- Line: Line 13
- Platforms: 2 (1 island platform)
- Tracks: 2

Construction
- Structure type: Underground
- Accessible: Yes

History
- Opened: 28 June 2026 (21 days ago)

Services
| Preceding station | Shenzhen Metro | Following station |
|---|---|---|
| Shangcun towards Shenzhen Bay Checkpoint | Line 13 | Lisonglang Terminus |
Location

Xiacun station (Chinese: 下村站; pinyin: Xiàcūn Zhàn; Cantonese Yale: Hahchyūn Jaahm) is a station on Line 13 of Shenzhen Metro. It opened on 28 June 2026, and is located in Gongming Subdistrict in Guangming District.

== Station layout ==
The station is a two-level underground island platform station constructed using the cut-and-cover method.

| G | - | Exits A1, B, C |
| B1F; Concourse | Lobby | Ticket Machines, Customer Service, Shops, Station Control Room |
| B2F; Platforms | Platform 1 | 13 towards Shenzhen Bay Checkpoint (Shangcun) |
| B2F; Platforms | Island platform, doors will open on the left |
| B2F; Platforms | Platform 2 | 13 towards Lisonglang (terminus) |

=== Entrances/exits ===
The station has 3 points of entry/exit. Exits A1 and B are equipped with elevators, and Exit B also has a toilet.

- : Shuibin Road, Gongming North Ring Avenue, Shenzhen Erya School, Maozhou River Sports and Arts Center
- : Shuibin Road, Shenzhen Guangming District People's Hospital Main Campus, Fuli Road
- : Shuibin Road, Shuiyin Road, Yongnan Industrial Zone

== History ==
In April 2024, the naming convention for the station as Xiacun station in the "Shenzhen Rail Transit Phase IV Adjustment Project" issued by the Shenzhen Municipal Planning and Natural Resources Bureau was approved. The term "Xiacun" originates from Gongming's "Shuibei Lower Village." After the Land Reform Movement in 1953, the original Shuibei Village was divided by a canal: the east side of the canal was called Shuibei Upper Village, the west side was Shuibei Lower Village, which later simplified to Shangcun and Xiacun.

The station opened as part of Line 13 Phase II northern extension on 28 June 2026.
