= Science Park station (Shenzhen Metro) =

Metro station in Shenzhen, China

Science Park 科学公园
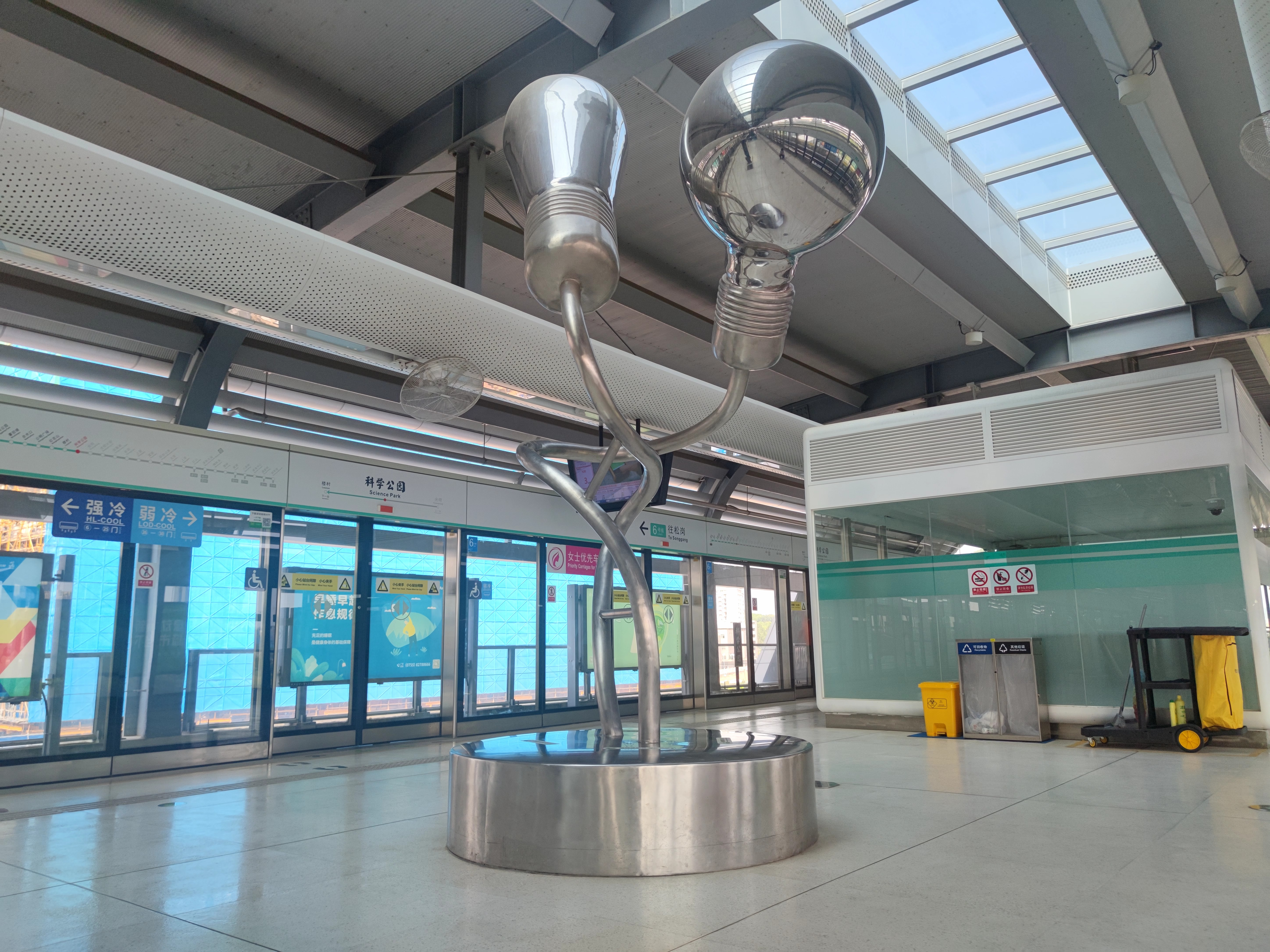

General information
- Location: Guangming District, Shenzhen, Guangdong; China
- Coordinates: 22.780432°N 113.929220°E
- Operated by: SZMC (Shenzhen Metro Group)
- Line: Line 6
- Platforms: 2 (1 island platform)
- Tracks: 2

Construction
- Structure type: Elevated
- Accessible: Yes

History
- Opened: 18 August 2020; 5 years ago

Services
Preceding station	Shenzhen Metro	Following station
Loucun towards Songgang	Line 6	Guangming towards Science Museum
Location

Science Park station (Chinese: 科学公园站; pinyin: Kēxué Gōngyuán Zhàn) is a station on Line 6 of the Shenzhen Metro. It opened on 18 August 2020.

== Station layout ==
3F; Platforms	Platform	← Line 6 towards Science Museum (Guangming)
3F; Platforms	Island platform, doors will open on the left
3F; Platforms	Platform	→ Line 6 towards Songgang (Loucun) →
2F; Concourse	Lobby	Customer Service, Shops, Vending machines, ATMs
G	-	Exit

== Exits ==
Exit	Destination
Exit A	Shifeng Science and Technology Park
Exit B	Loucun primary school
Exit C	
Exit D	
