= Lisonglang station =

Shenzhen Metro Line 13 station

Lisonglang 李松蓢
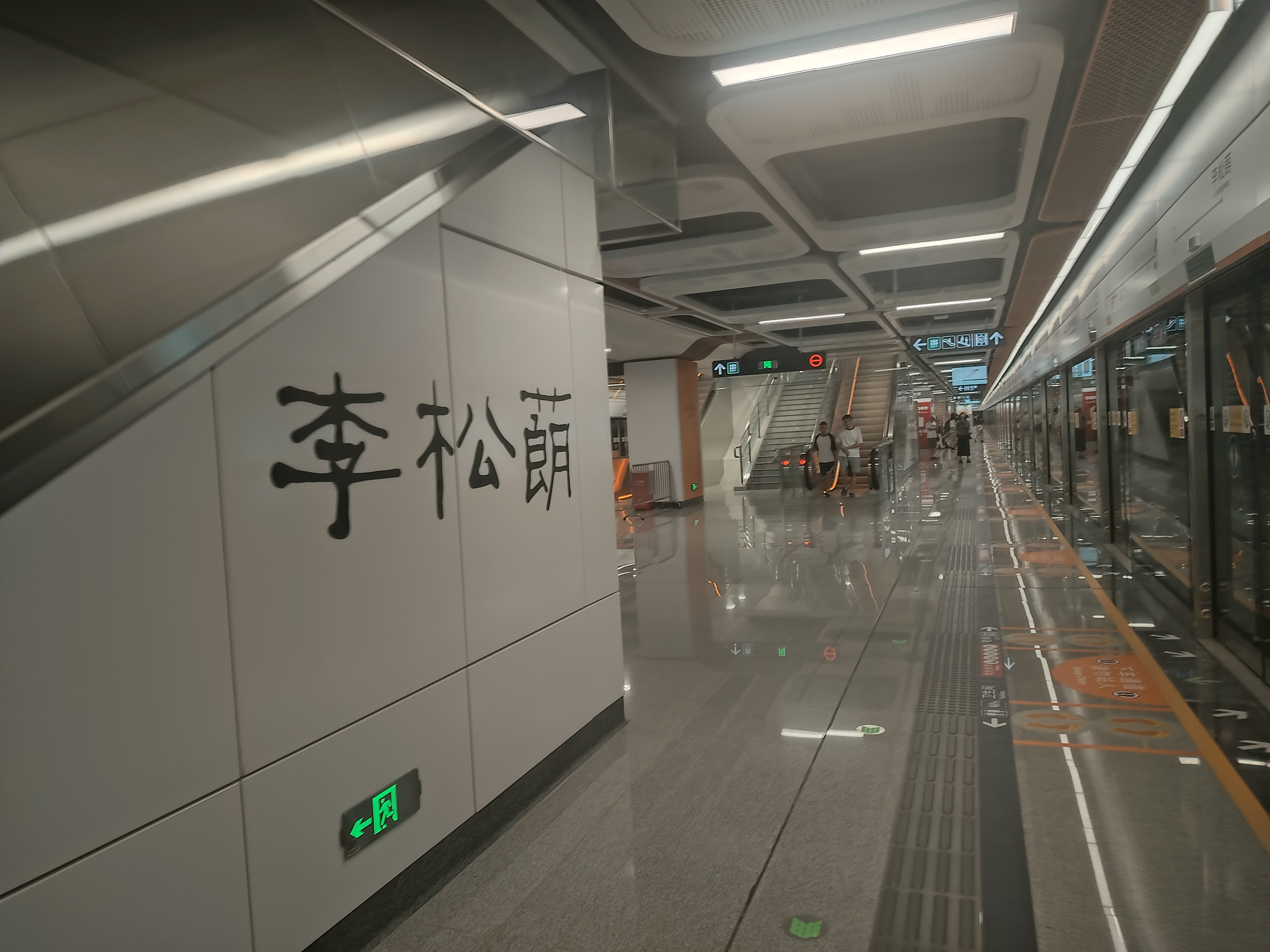
- Platform calligraphy

Chinese name
- Chinese: 李松蓢
Transcriptions
Standard Mandarin
- Hanyu Pinyin: Lǐsōnglǎng
Yue: Cantonese
- Yale Romanization: Leíhchùhnglóhng
- Jyutping: lei5 cung4 long5

General information
- Location: Intersection of Lisonglang Paotai Road (李松蓢炮台路) and Lisonglang Dayuan Road (李松蓢大园路); Gongming Subdistrict, Guangming District, Shenzhen, Guangdong; China
- Coordinates: 22°48′30.2″N 113°53′21.7″E
- Operated by: MTR China Railway Electrification Rail Transit (Shenzhen) Co., Ltd (MTR Rail Transit (Shenzhen) Co., Ltd. and China Railway Electrification Bureau Group Co., Ltd.)
- Line: Line 13
- Platforms: 2 (1 island platform)
- Tracks: 2

Construction
- Structure type: Underground
- Accessible: Yes

History
- Opened: 28 June 2026 (18 days ago)
- Previous names: Gongming North (公明北)

Services
Preceding station	Shenzhen Metro	Following station
Xiacun towards Shenzhen Bay Checkpoint	Line 13	Terminus
Location

Lisonglang station (Chinese: 李松蓢站; pinyin: Lǐsōnglǎng Zhàn; Cantonese Yale: Leíhchùhnglóhng Jaahm) is a station on Line 13 of Shenzhen Metro and serves as its northern terminus. It opened on 28 June 2026, and is located in Gongming Subdistrict in Guangming District.

== Station layout ==
G	-	Exits A-D
B1F; Concourse	Lobby	Ticket Machines, Customer Service, Station Control Room
B2F; Platforms	Platform 1	13 towards Shenzhen Bay Checkpoint (Xiacun)
B2F; Platforms	Island platform, doors will open on the left
B2F; Platforms	Platform 2	13 termination platform

=== Gallery ===
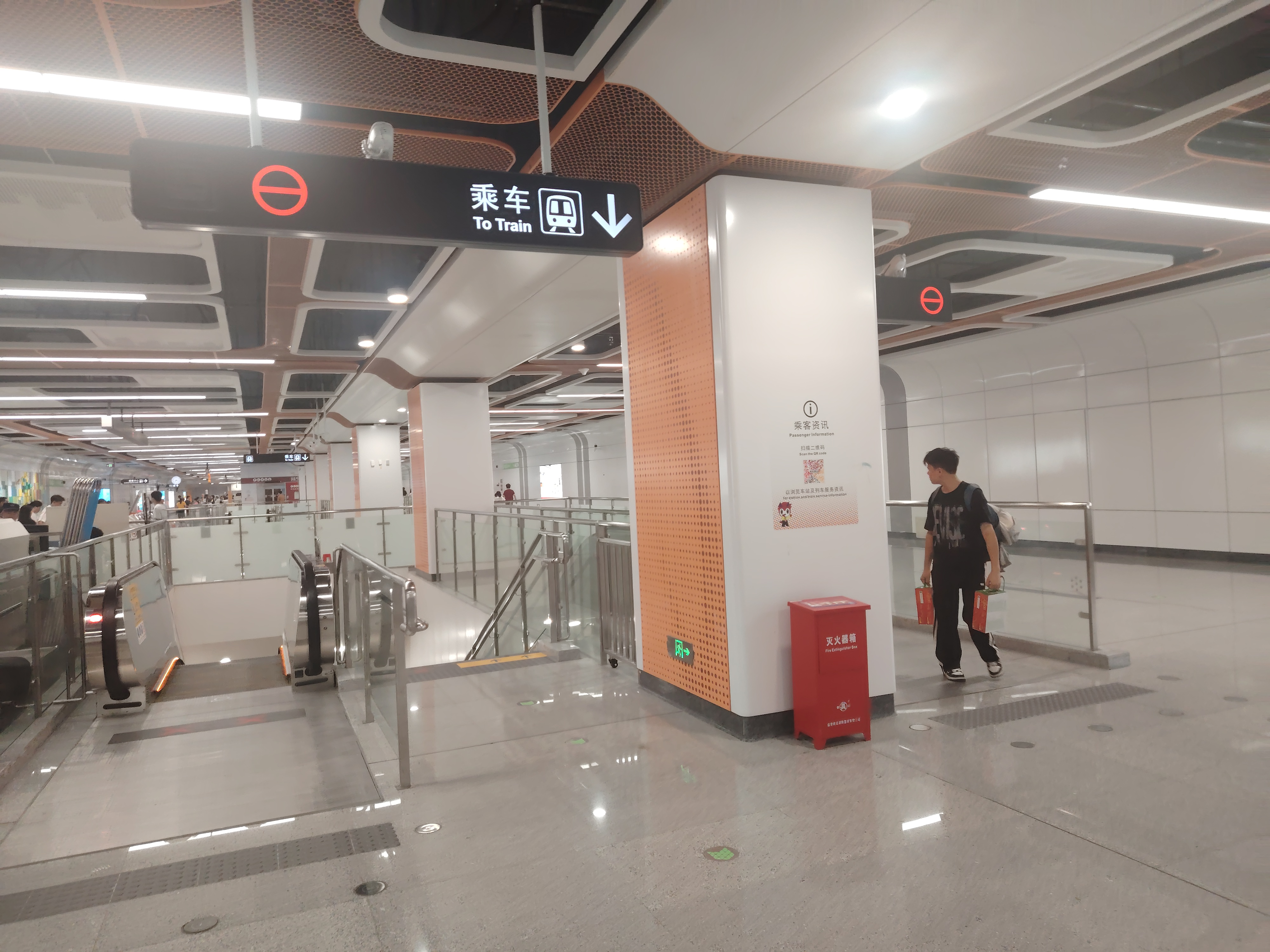
Concourse

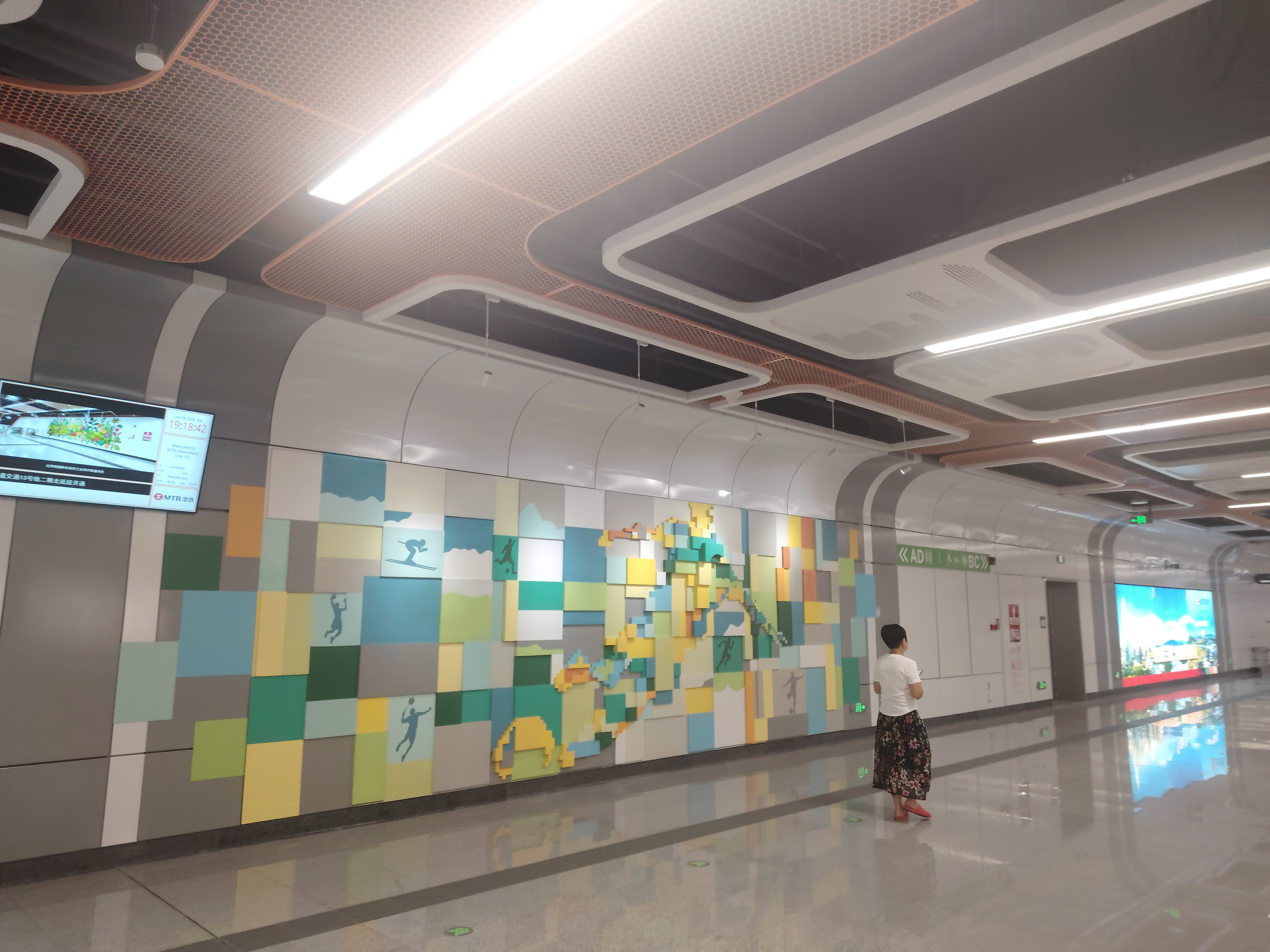
Art wall

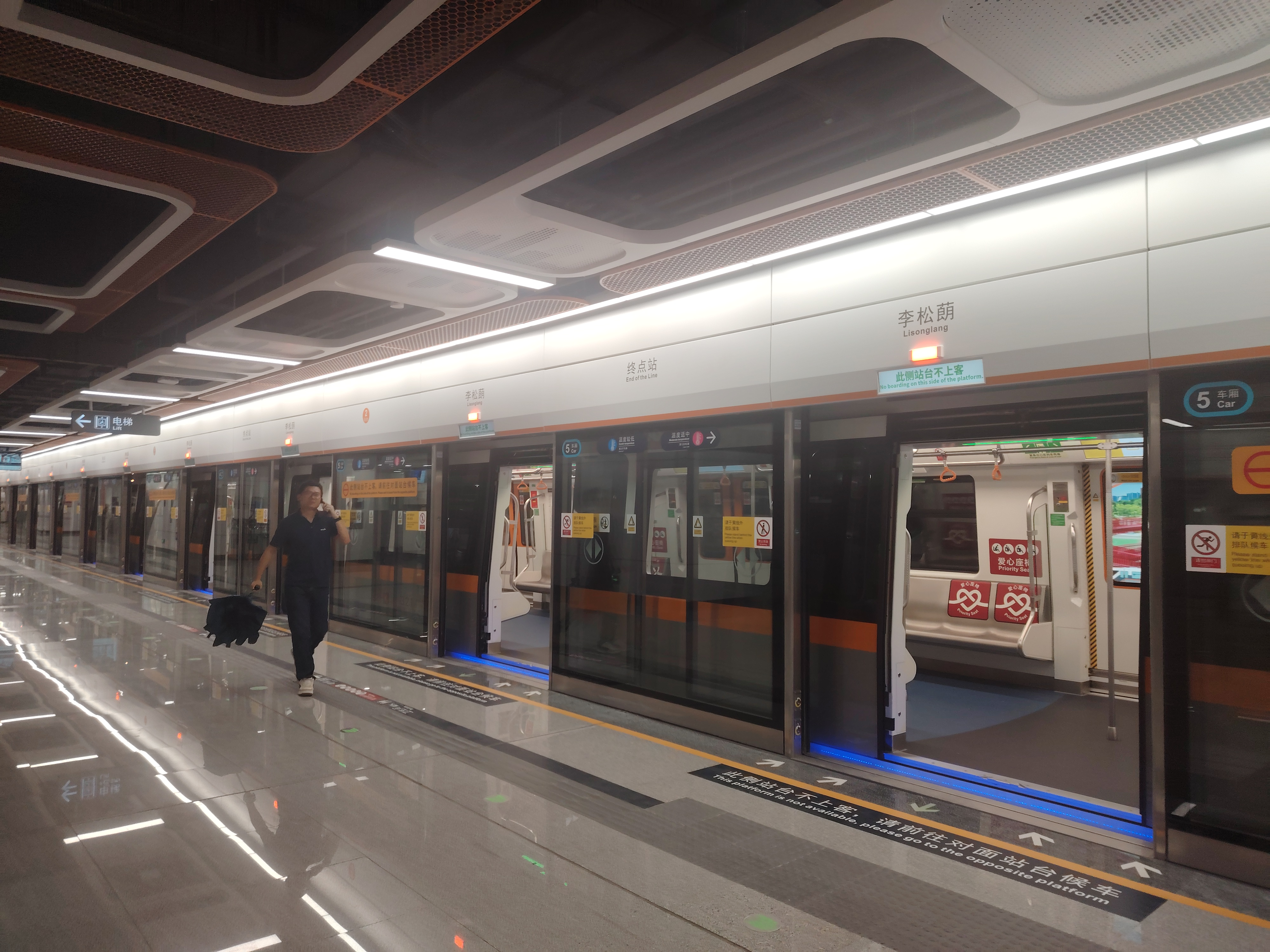
Platform 2 (alighting platform)

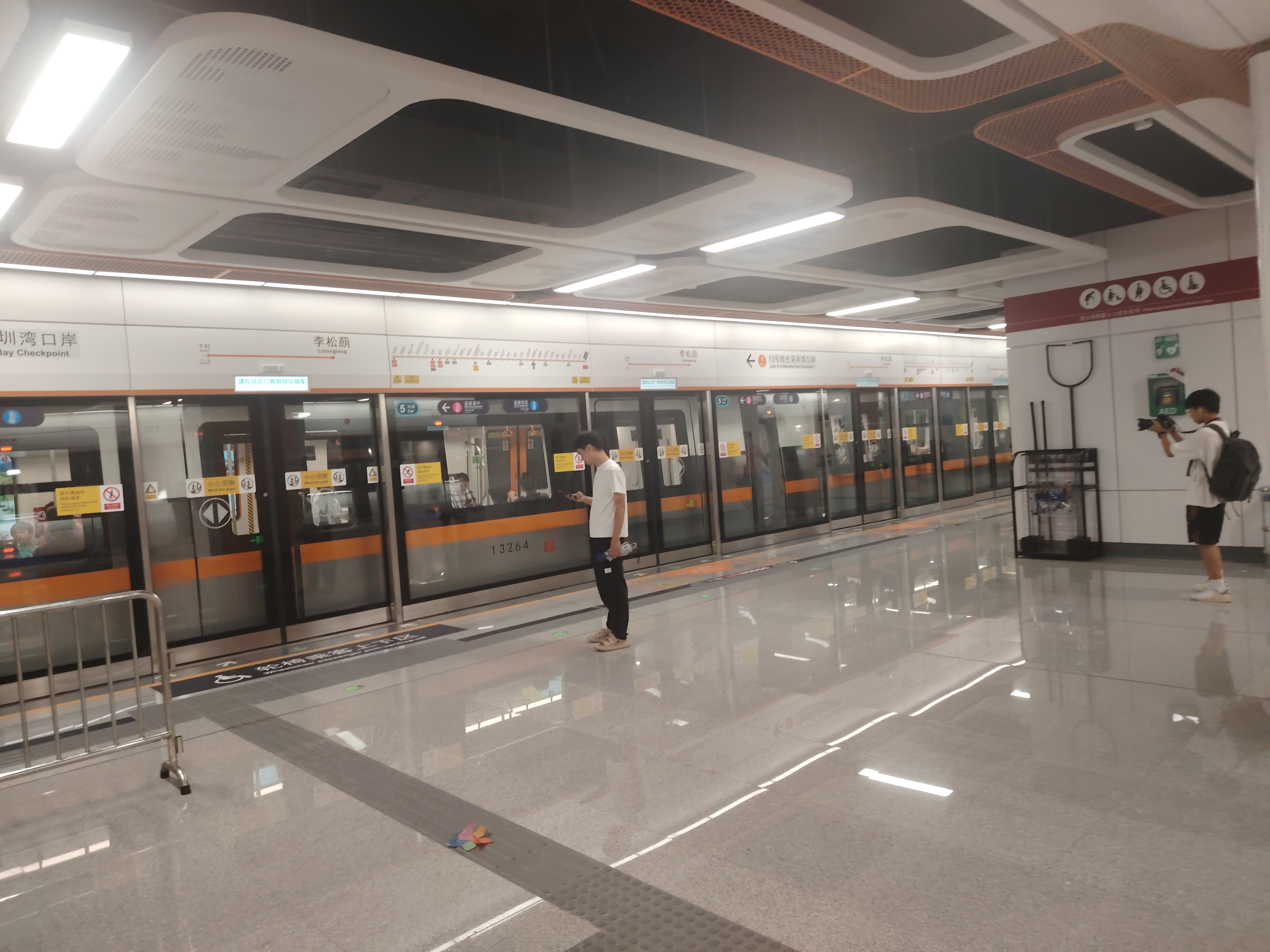
Platform 1 (boarding platform)

=== Entrances/exits ===
The station has 4 points of entry/exit. Exits A and D are equipped with elevators.

- : Lisonglang Paotai Road, Zekeng Road, Lisonglang First Industrial Zone, Xitian Village
- : Lisonglang Paotai Road, Wuyuan Road, Lisonglang First Industrial Zone
- : Lisonglang Paotai Road, Wuyuan Road, Wanli Science and Technology Park
- : Lisonglang Paotai Road, Dayuan Road, Fuli North Road, Shenzhen Youth Football Training Base, Shenzhen Football Association, Lisonglang New Village
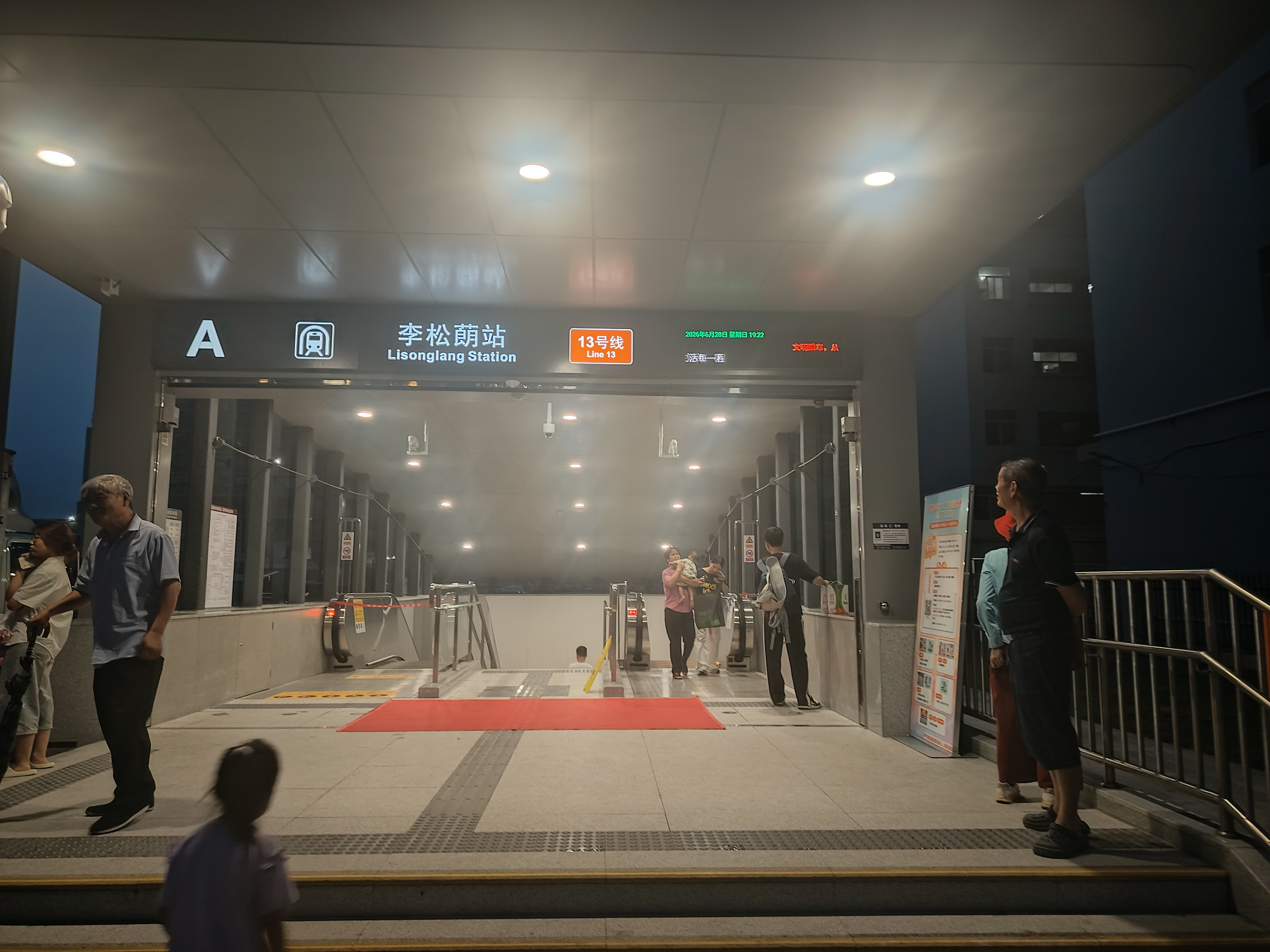
Exit A

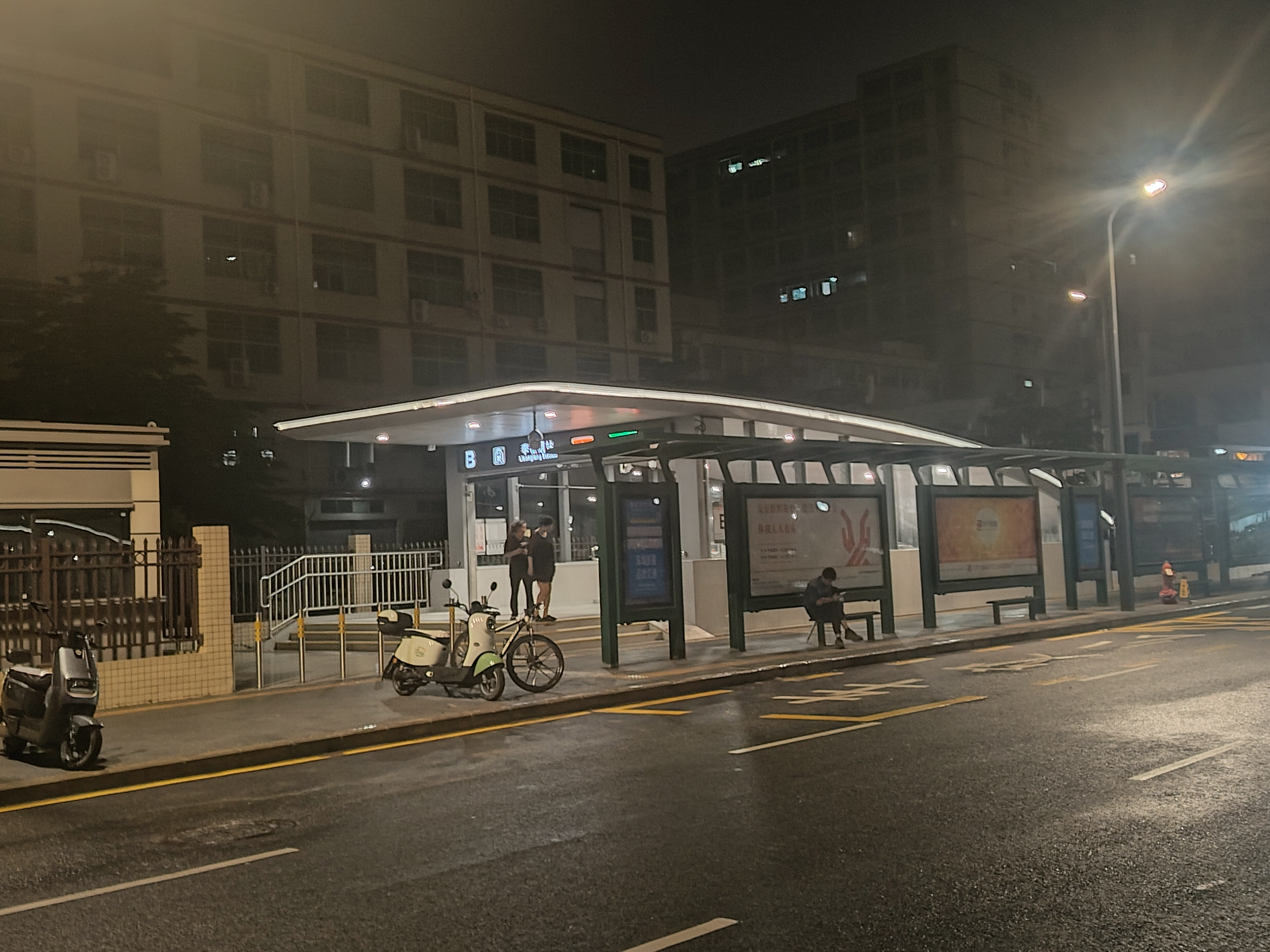
Exit B

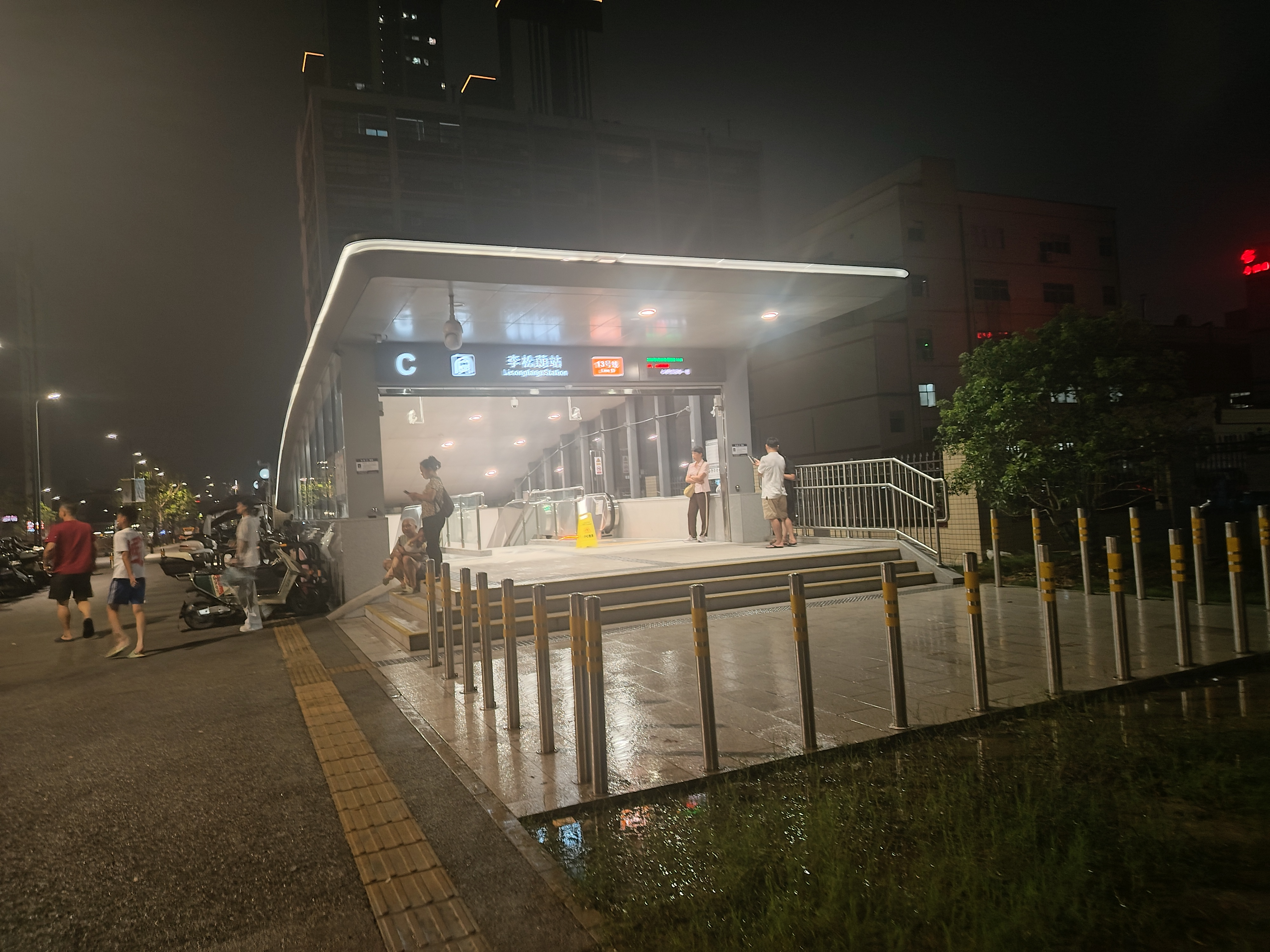
Exit C

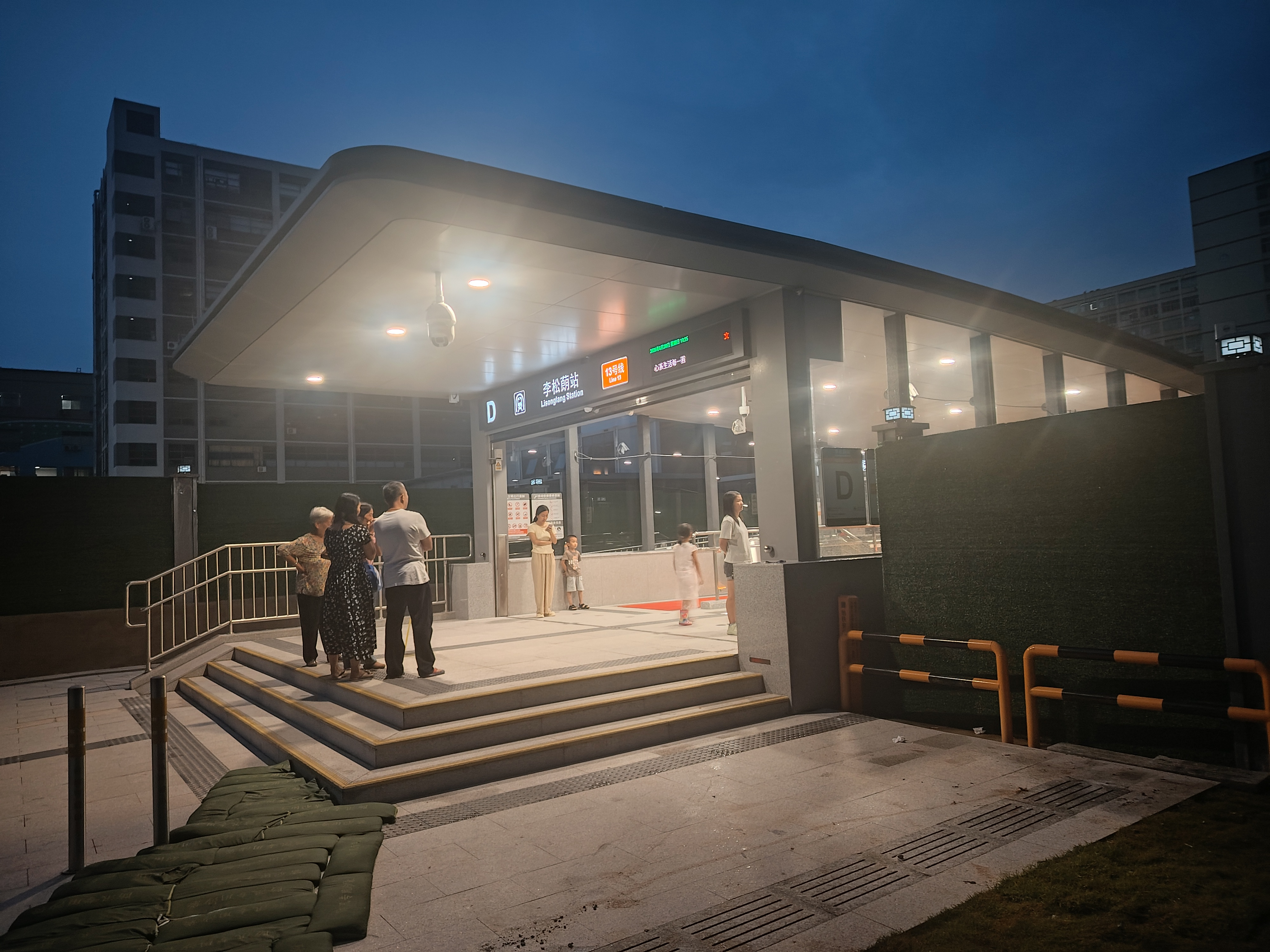
Exit D

== History ==
During construction, the station was called Gongming North station. In July 2023, the main structure of the station successfully topped out.

In April 2024, the naming convention for the station as Lisonglang station in the "Shenzhen Rail Transit Phase IV Adjustment Project" issued by the Shenzhen Municipal Planning and Natural Resources Bureau was approved.

== Future development ==
The station has built reserved transfer structures for future interchanges with Line 26 and Dongguan Rail Transit Line 5.
