= Shenzhen University station =

Metro station in Shenzhen, Guangdong, China

Shenzhen University 深大
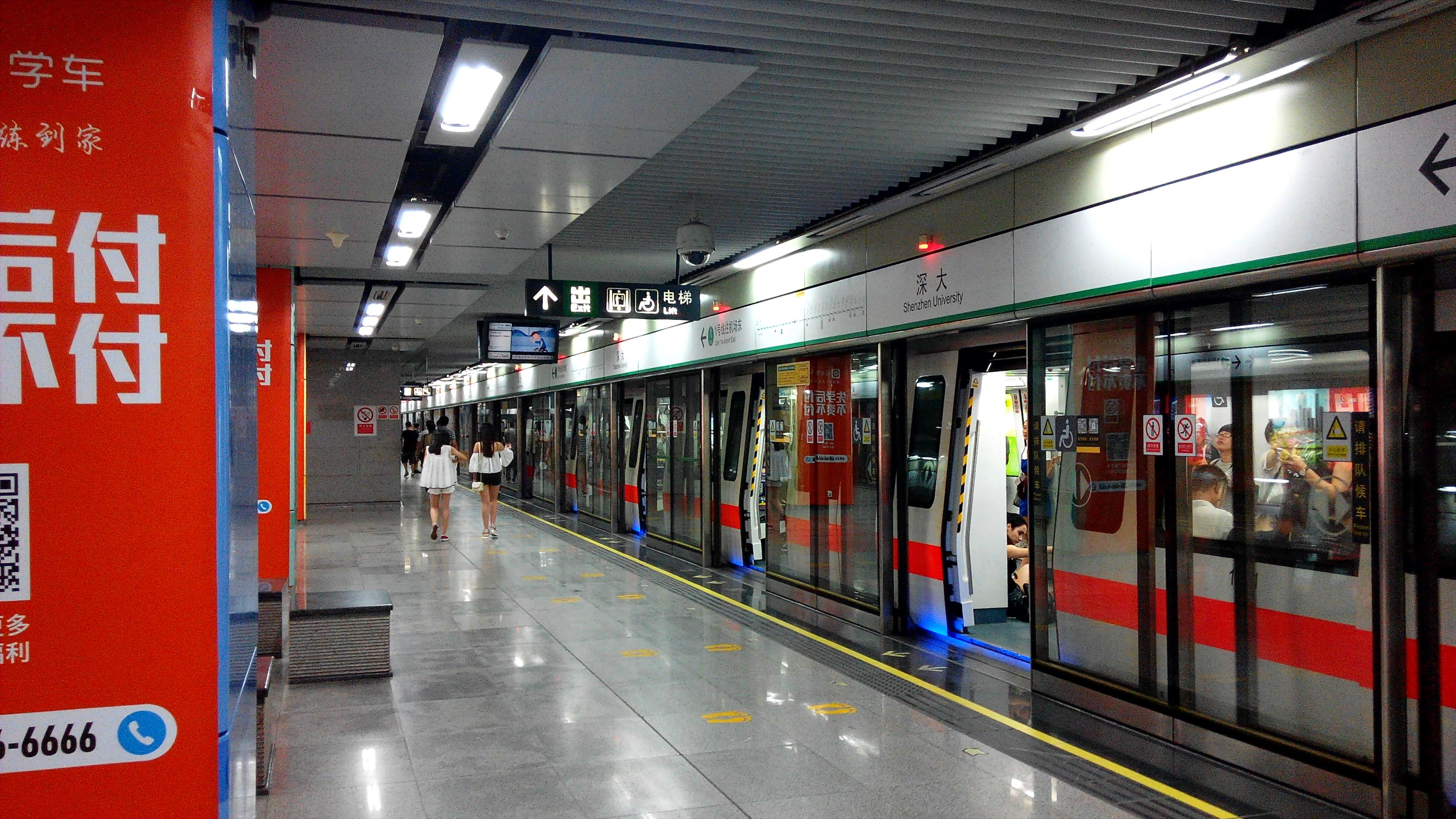
- Line 1 platform (July 2016)

Chinese name
- Chinese: 深大
- Literal meaning: Shenzhen University
Transcriptions
Standard Mandarin
- Hanyu Pinyin: Shēn Dà
Yue: Cantonese
- Jyutping: Sam1 Daai6

General information
- Location: Nanshan District, Shenzhen, Guangdong; China
- Coordinates: 22°32′19″N 113°56′39″E
- Operated by: SZMC (Shenzhen Metro Group); MTR China Railway Electrification Rail Transit (Shenzhen) Co., Ltd (MTR Rail Transit (Shenzhen) Co., Ltd. and China Railway Electrification Bureau Group Co., Ltd.)
- Lines: Line 1 Line 13
- Platforms: 4 (2 island platforms)
- Tracks: 4

Construction
- Structure type: Underground
- Accessible: Yes

Other information
- Station code: 113 (Line 1); 1322 (Line 13)

History
- Opened: Line 1: 28 September 2009 (16 years ago); Line 13: 28 December 2024 (18 months ago)
- Previous names: Shenda

Services
Preceding station	Shenzhen Metro	Following station
Taoyuan towards Airport East	Line 1	Hi-Tech Park towards Luohu
Yuehaimen towards Shenzhen Bay Checkpoint	Line 13	Hi-Tech Central towards Lisonglang
Route map
Location

Shenzhen University station (Chinese: 深大站; pinyin: Shēndàzhàn; Jyutping: Sam1 Daai6 Zaam6) is an interchange station between Line 1 and Line 13 of Shenzhen Metro, and was the terminus of Line 1 until 15 June 2011. The Line 1 station opened on 28 September 2009. It is located underneath Kejinnan Yilu (科技南一路), west of the intersection of Shennan Blvd (深南大道) and Keyuan Road S. (科苑南路), Nanshan District, Shenzhen, China. The station is named after Shenzhen University, but its name has been criticised since it is actually near Shenzhen High-Tech Park (深圳高新技术园; 深圳高新技術園). The Line 13 station opened on 28 December 2024.

== Station layout ==
G	-	Exit
B1F; Concourse	Lobby	Ticket Machines, Customer Service
B2F; 1 Platforms	Platform 1	1 towards Airport East (Taoyuan)
B2F; 1 Platforms	Island platform, doors will open on the left
B2F; 1 Platforms	Platform 2	1 towards Luohu (Hi-Tech Park)
B3F; 13 Platforms	Platform 1	13 towards Shenzhen Bay Checkpoint (Yuehaimen)
B3F; 13 Platforms	Island platform, doors will open on the left
B3F; 13 Platforms	Platform 2	13 towards Lisonglang (Hi-Tech Central)

== Exits ==
Exit letter		Gallery	Destination
A	A		Shennan Boulevard, Keyuan South Road, Shenzhen University north gate, Great Wall
A	A1	reserved	Shennan Boulevard (S)
A	A2		Shennan Boulevard (S), Shenzhen University north gate
A	A3		Shennan Boulevard (N), To Nanshan, Shekou, Bao'an, Keji Middle 3rd Road, Shenzhen Software Park
A	A4		Shennan Boulevard (N), Keyuan Road South, Shenzhen Wuzhou Hospital of Integrated Chinese and Western Medicine
C			Keji South 1st Road, Shenzhen Virtual University Park, Yuehaimencun, Shenzhen Software Park, Digital Technology Park, Shenzhen Virtual University Town, Agency of State Intellectual Property Office in Shenzhen, Shenzhen Talent Exchange Center, Shenzhen-Hong Kong Production, Teaching, and Research Base of Modern Computer Engineering R&D Center, Shenzhen Institute of Huazhong Science & Technology University, Research Institute of Tsinghua University in Shenzhen, Production, Teaching, and Research Base of the Hong Kong Polytechnic University, Hi-Tech Area Venture Investment Service Plaza, Apartment No. 33, Hi-Tech Industrial Area
D			Keji Road South, Keji South 1st Road, Crowne Plaza Shenzhen Metro King's Birthday Hotel, Science and Technology Park Bus Terminus, Shenzhen Railway Financial Technology Building
E			West side of Keji Road South
J			South side of Keji Road South
K			North side of Hi-Tech South 1st Road

== Gallery ==
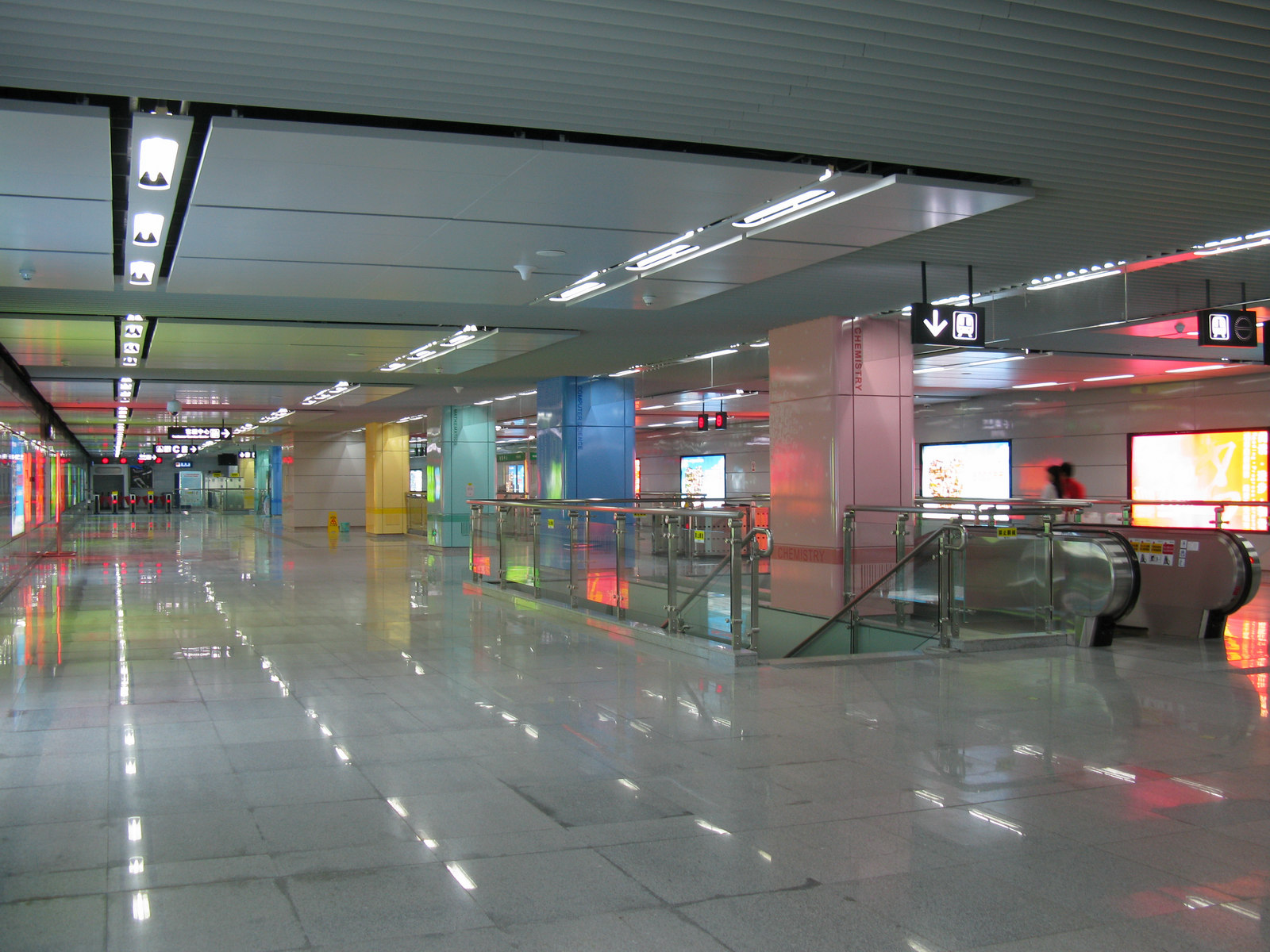
Line 1 concourse (2009)

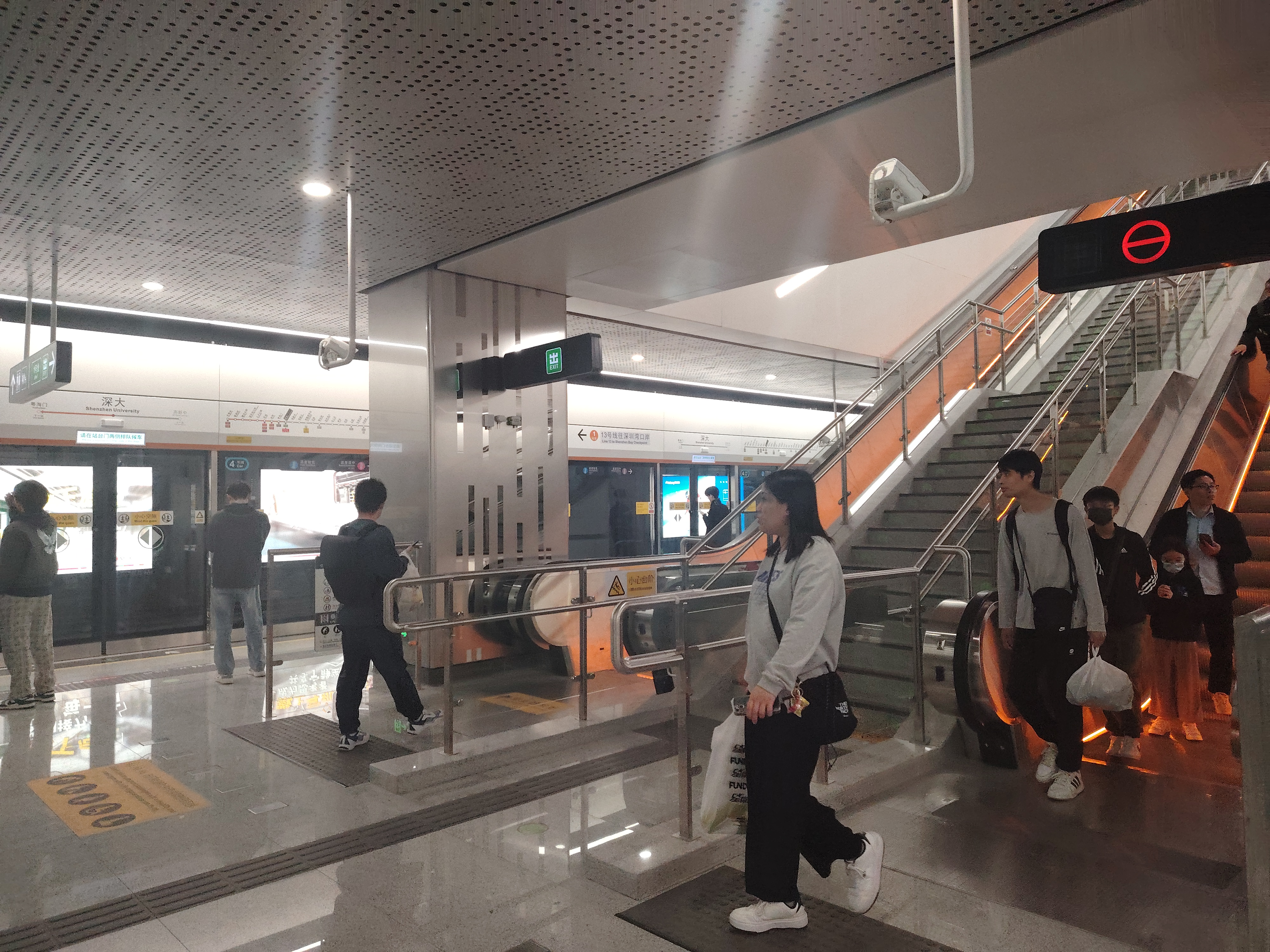
Line 13 platform

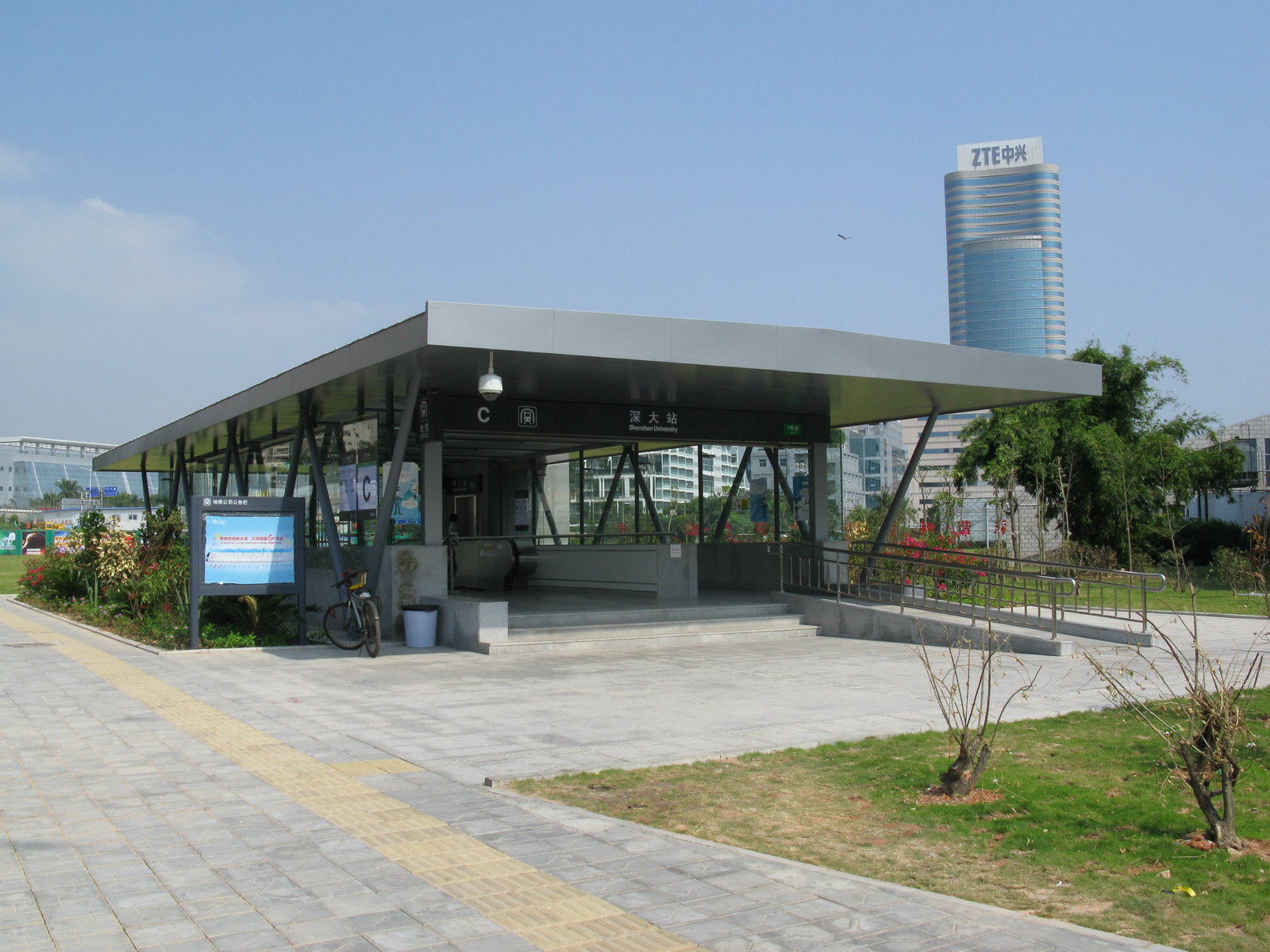
Exit C in 2009

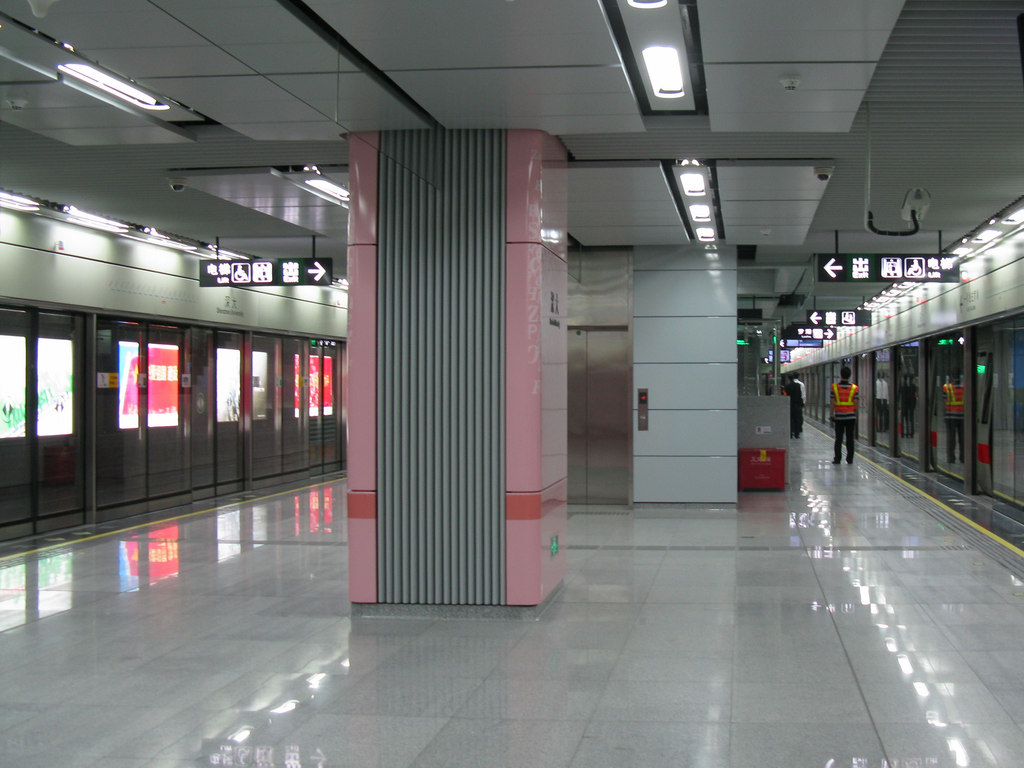
Line 1 platform in 2009
