= Hi-Tech North station =

Shenzhen Metro Line 13 station

Hi-Tech North 高新北
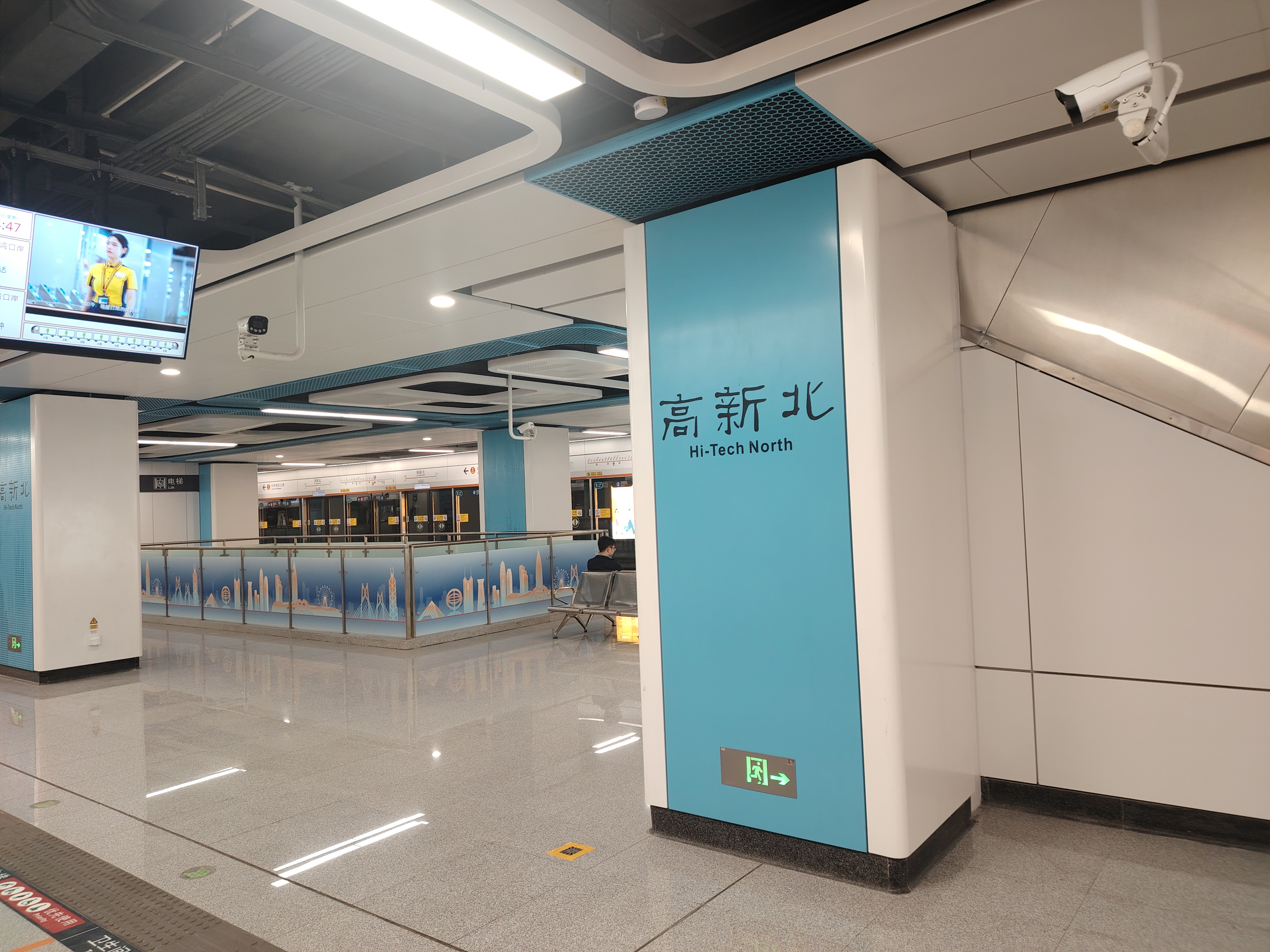
- Platform

Chinese name
- Chinese: 高新北
Transcriptions
Standard Mandarin
- Hanyu Pinyin: Gāoxīn Běi
Yue: Cantonese
- Yale Romanization: Gōusān Bāk
- Jyutping: Gou1 San1 Bak1

General information
- Location: Intersection of Keyuan Road (科苑路) and Langshan Road (朗山路); Yuehai Subdistrict, Nanshan District, Shenzhen, Guangdong; China
- Coordinates: 22°33′35″N 113°56′26″E
- Operated by: MTR China Railway Electrification Rail Transit (Shenzhen) Co., Ltd (MTR Rail Transit (Shenzhen) Co., Ltd. and China Railway Electrification Bureau Group Co., Ltd.)
- Line: Line 13
- Platforms: 2 (1 island platform)
- Tracks: 2

Construction
- Structure type: Underground
- Accessible: Yes

History
- Opened: 28 December 2025 (6 months ago)
- Previous names: Songping (松坪)

Services
Preceding station	Shenzhen Metro	Following station
Hi-Tech Central towards Shenzhen Bay Checkpoint	Line 13	Shigu towards Lisonglang
Location

Hi-Tech North station (Chinese: 高新北站; pinyin: Gāoxīnběi Zhàn; Cantonese Yale: Gōusān Bāk Jaahm) is a station on Line 13 of Shenzhen Metro. It opened on 28 December 2025, and is located in Nanshan District.

== Station layout ==
G	-	Exits A1, A2, C, D, E
B1F; Concourse	Lobby	Ticket Machines, Customer Service, Station Control Room
B2F; Platforms	Platform 1	13 towards Shenzhen Bay Checkpoint (Hi-Tech Central)
B2F; Platforms	Island platform, doors will open on the left
B2F; Platforms	Platform 2	13 towards Lisonglang (Shigu)

=== Gallery ===
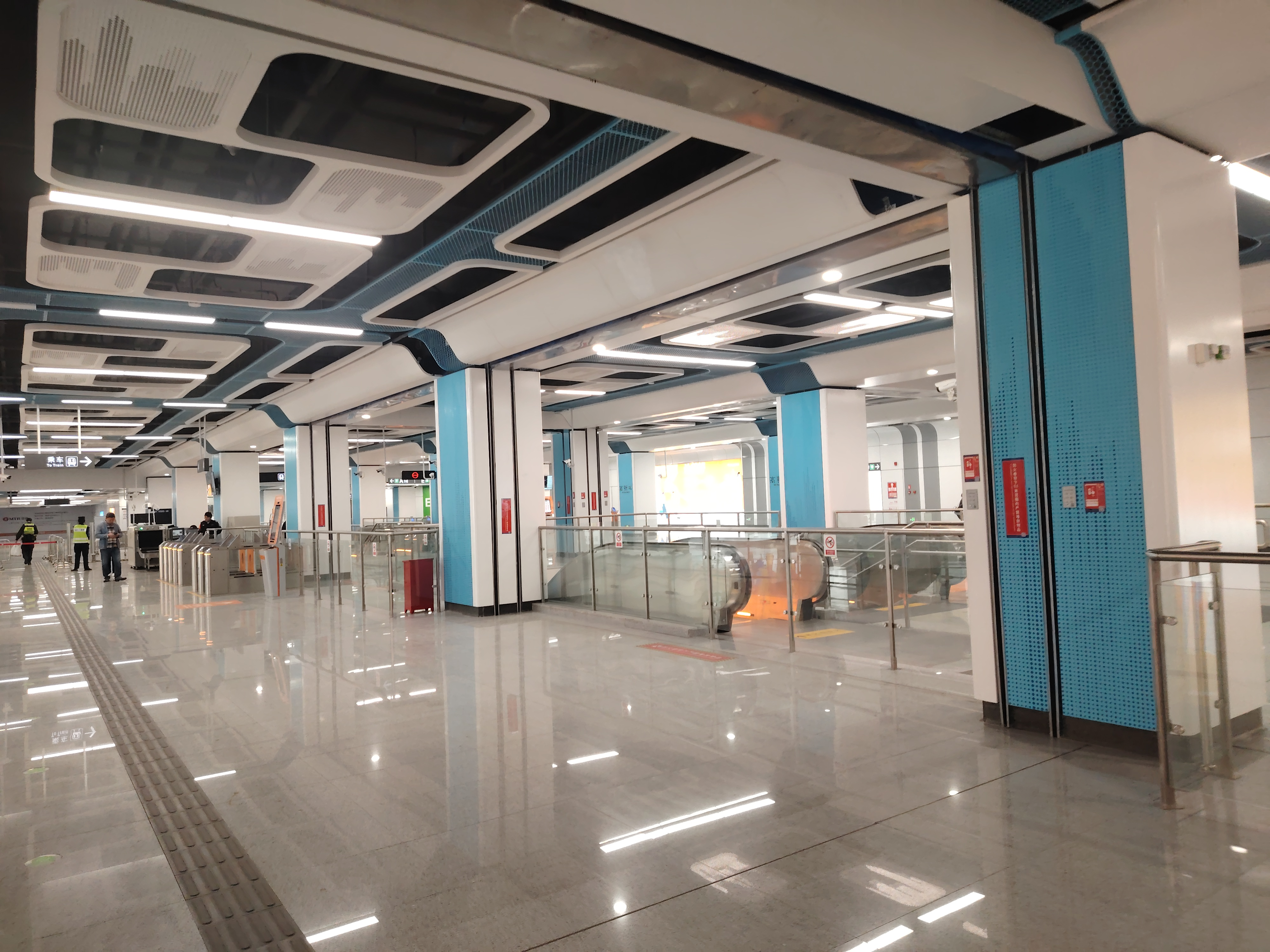
Concourse

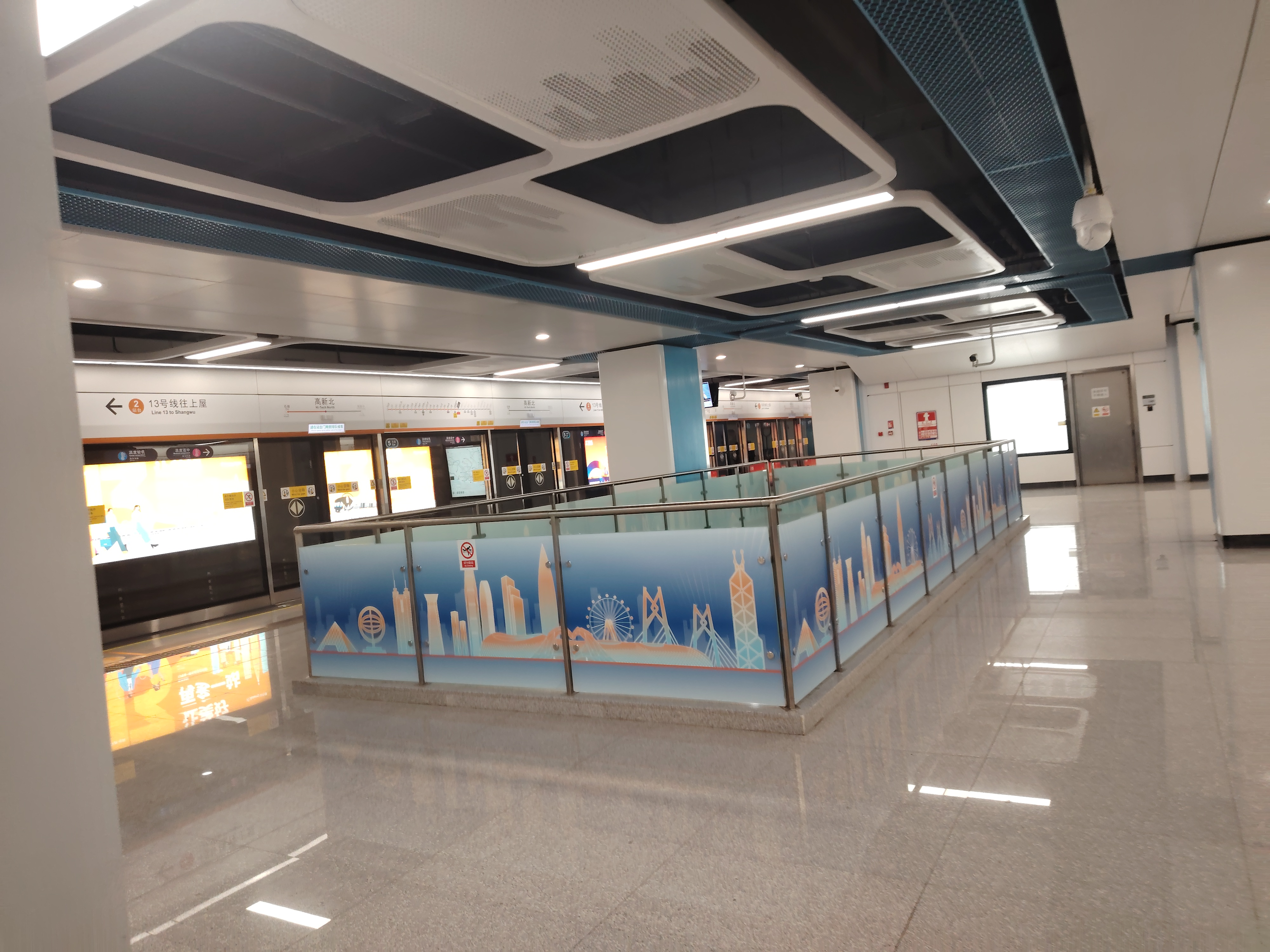
Platform, in the middle is a reserved transfer node to Line 24

=== Entrances/exits ===
The station has 5 points of entry/exit. Exits A2 and C are equipped with elevators.

- : Keyuan Road (E), Langshan Road, Dongjiang Environmental Company Limited Building
- : Keyuan Road (E), Langshan Road, Fuwai Shenzhen Hospital, Songping Hill Park, Songping No. 2 Primary School
- : Keyuan Road (W), Langshan Road, China Resources Beverage (Holdings) Company Limited Main Factory, Shenzhen Neptunus Bioengineering Company Limited, Coolpad
- : Keyuan Road (W), Langshan Road, Health Yuan Group Headquarters Garden, Shenzhen Flour Company Limited, Hytera Building, Shenzhen Hepalink Pharmaceutical Group Company Limited
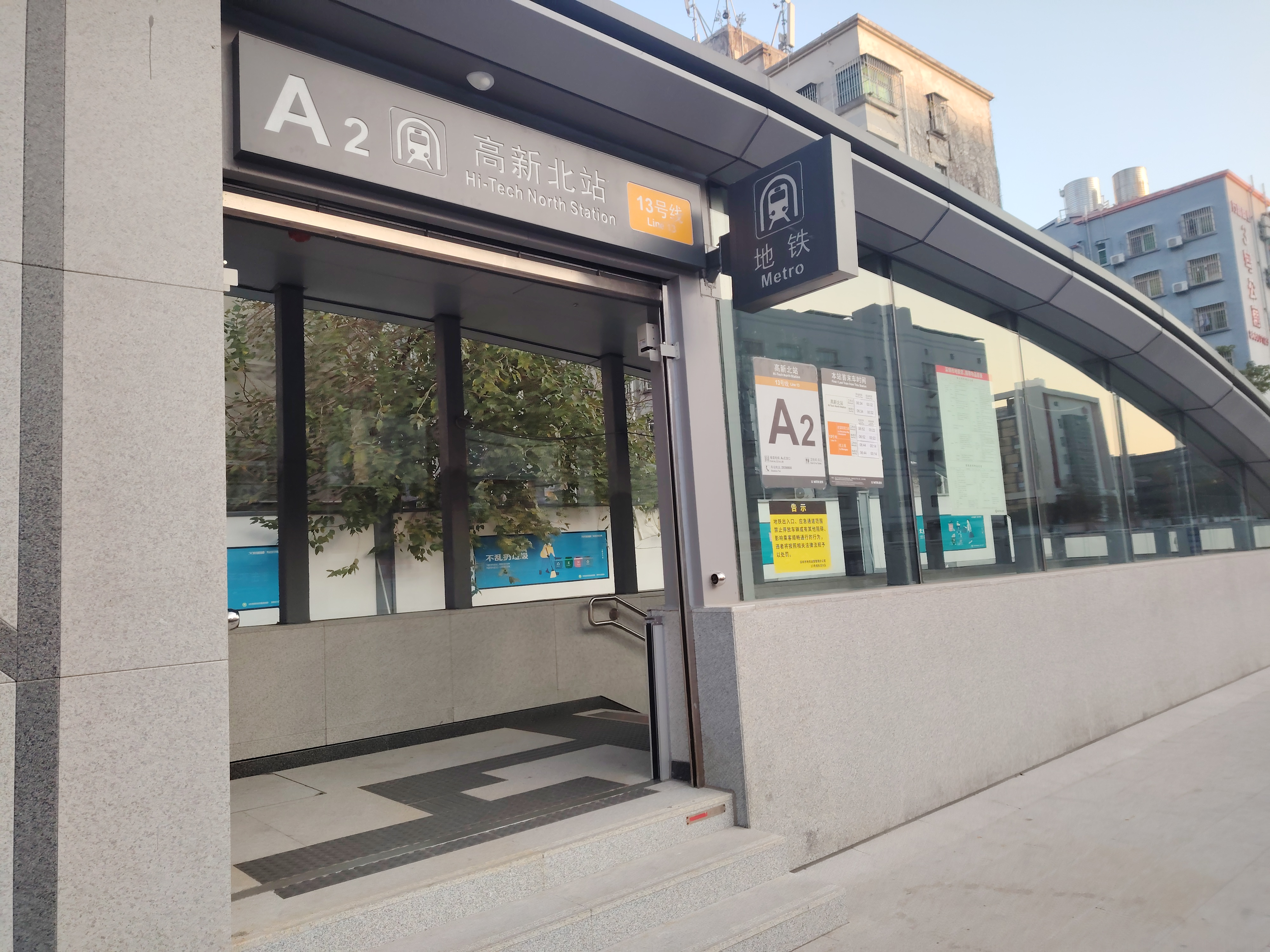
Entrance A2

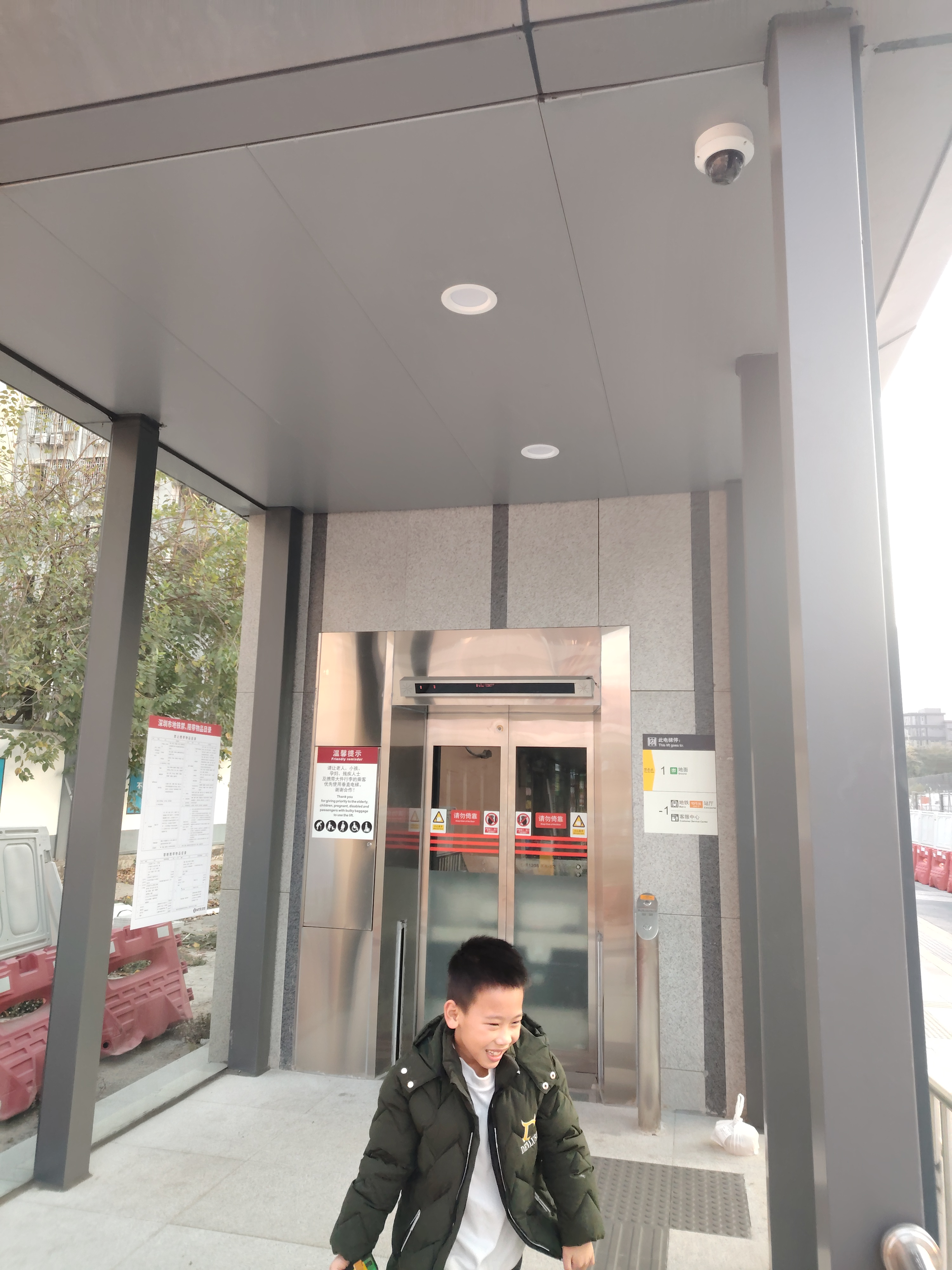
Entrance A2 (elevator entrance)

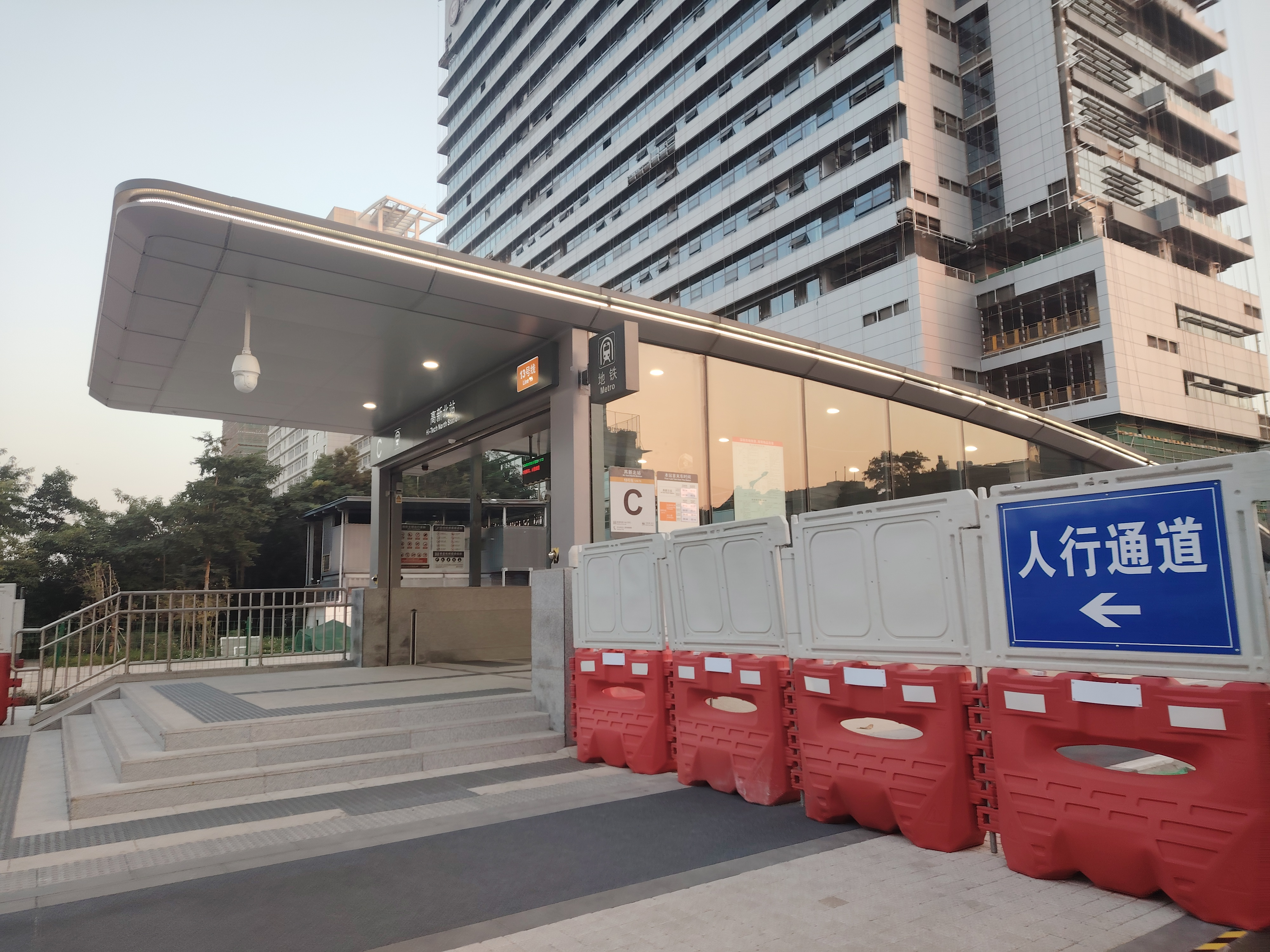
Entrance C

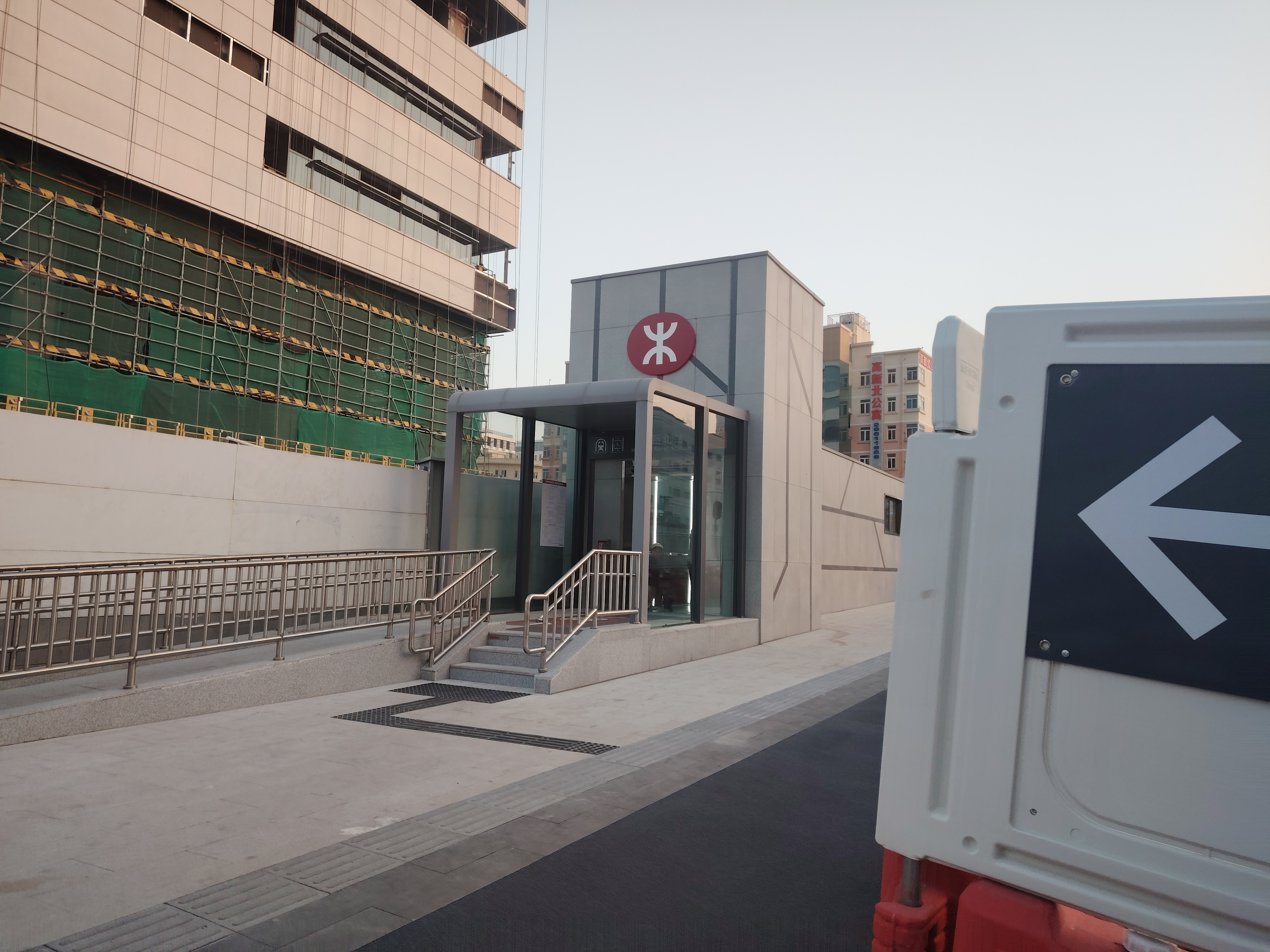
Entrance C (elevator entrance)

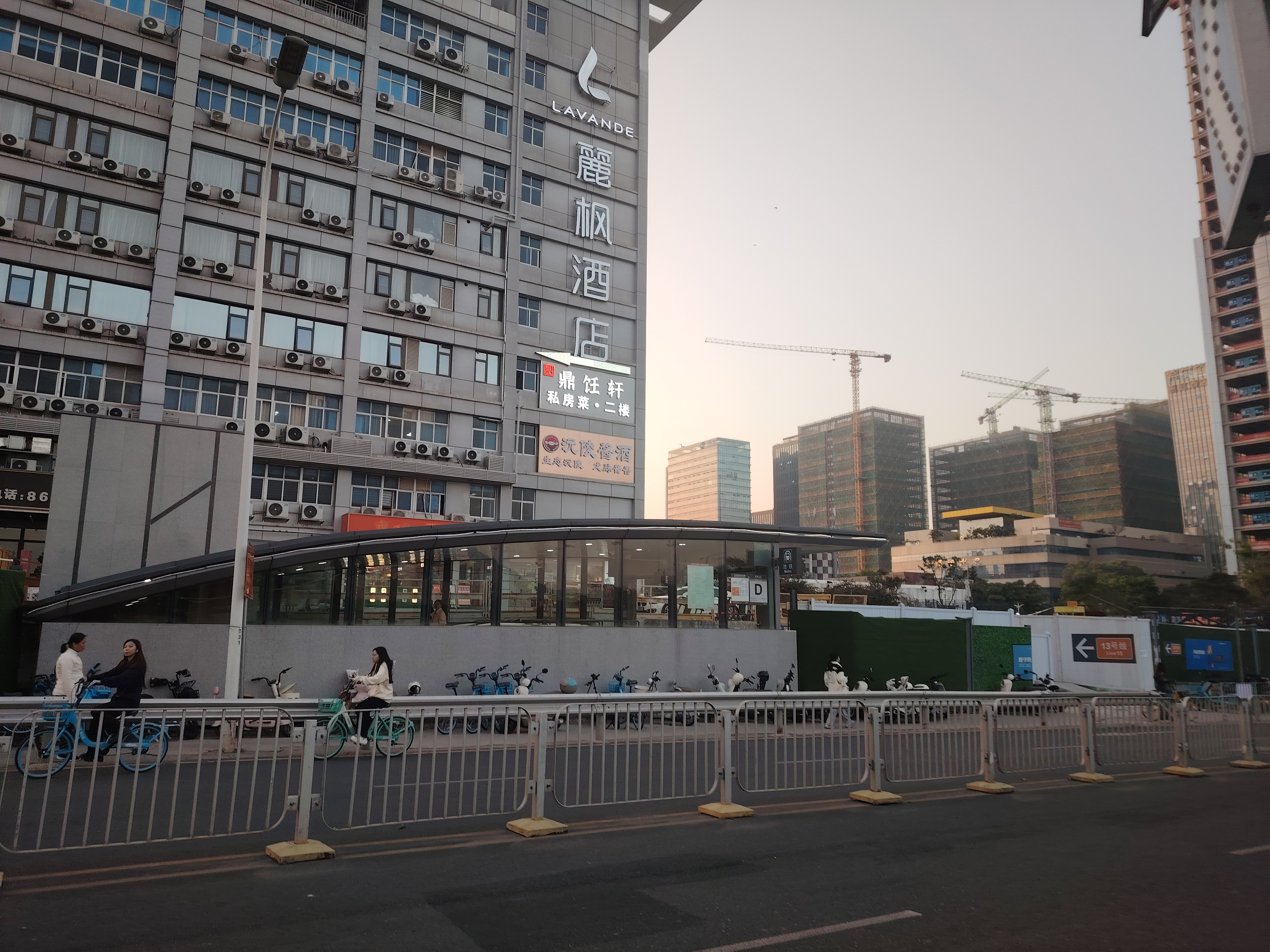
Entrance D

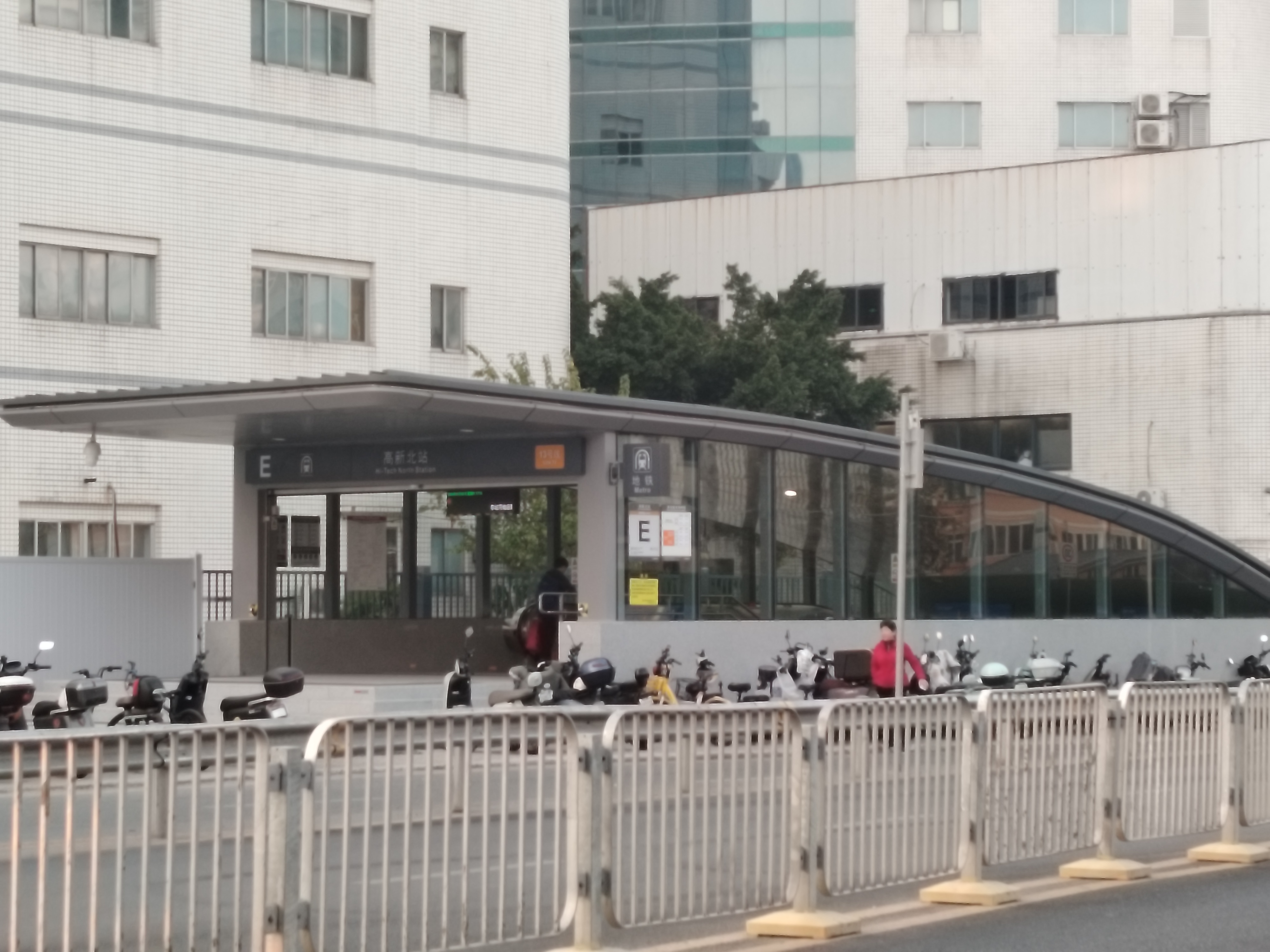
Entrance E

== Construction timeline ==
- On 26 July 2017, Shenzhen Metro Group Co., Ltd. issued the "Environmental Impact Report of Shenzhen Urban Rail Transit Line 13 Project", which includes this station, and the project was named Songping Station.
- On 22 April 2022, the Shenzhen Municipal Bureau of Planning and Natural Resources issued the Announcement on the Approval of the Plan for the Station Names of Relevant Lines of the Fourth Phase of Shenzhen Metro, and the station was renamed from "Kexing Station" to the official station name, "Hi-Tech North Station".
- On 25 July 2022, the station structure was successfully enclosed.
- On 28 December 2025, the station officially opened along with the new stations of Line 13's Phase 1 North Section (except Xili HSR station).
