= Line 13 (Shenzhen Metro) =

Metro line in Shenzhen, China

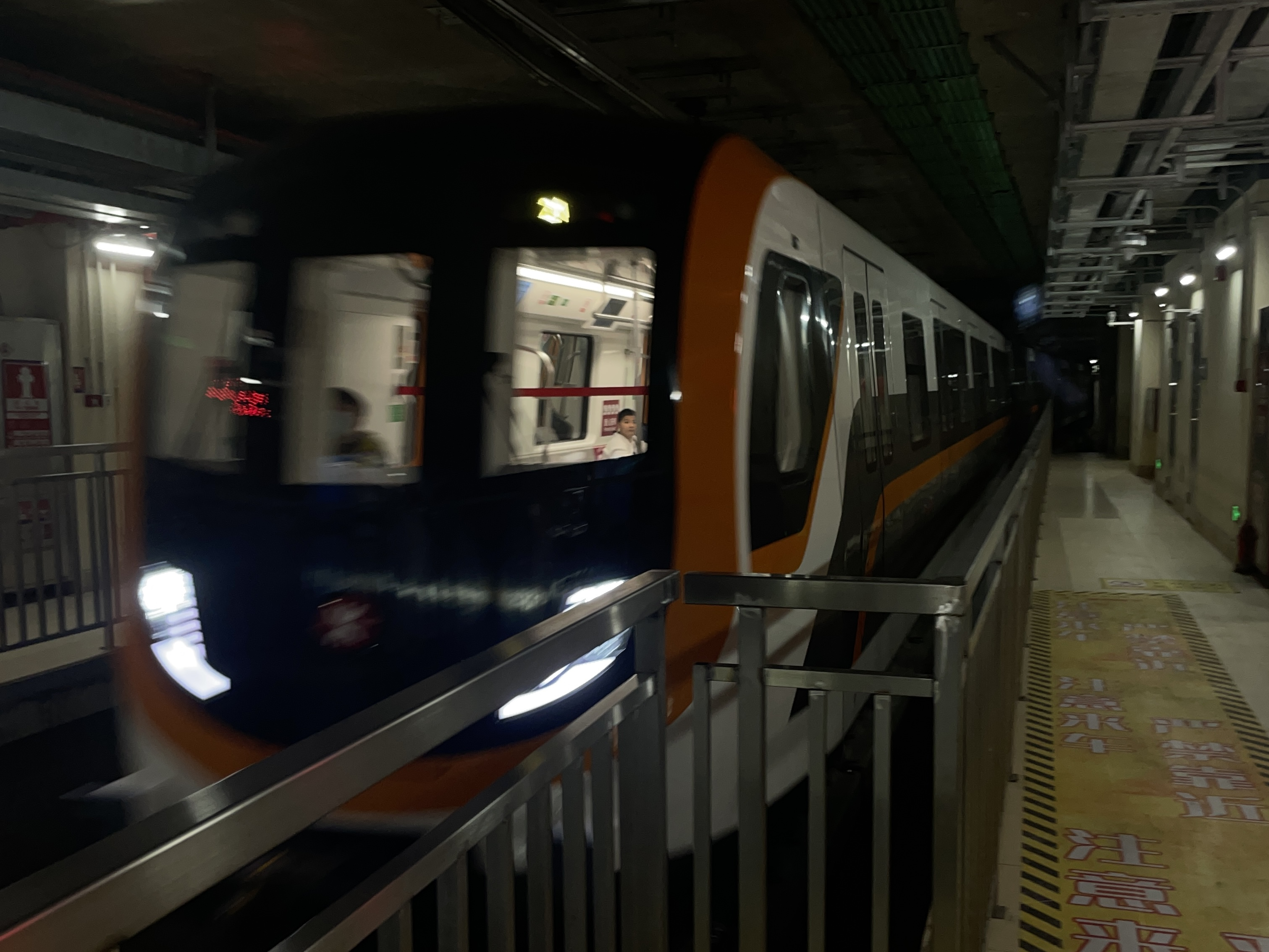
- A train of Shenzhen Metro Line 13

Overview
- Other name(s): Shiyan Line (石岩线; 石岩線; shíyán xiàn)
- Status: Operational
- Locale: Bao'an, Nanshan and Guangming districts Shenzhen, Guangdong
- Termini: Shenzhen Bay Checkpoint; Lisonglang
- Stations: 26
- Color on map: Mandarin Orange (#de7c00)

Service
- Type: Rapid transit
- System: Shenzhen Metro
- Services: 1
- Operator: MTR CREC Metro (Shenzhen) Company Limited

History
- Opened: 28 December 2024; 20 months ago (Phase 1 South Section)
- Last extension: 28 June 2026; 2 months ago (Phase 2 North Section)

Technical
- Line length: 41.8km (Phase 1)
- Number of tracks: 2
- Character: Underground
- Track gauge: 1,435 mm (4 ft 8 1/2 in)
- Electrification: Overhead Line, 1,500 V DC
- Operating speed: 100 km/h (62 mph)

Line 13 of the Shenzhen Metro is one of the four new operational metro lines of the metro's Phase IV expansion in the city of Shenzhen, Guangdong. The line first opened on 28 December 2024.

The 6.36 km Phase 1 South section between Shenzhen Bay Checkpoint and Hi-Tech Central opened on 28 December 2024. The Phase 1 North section (except Xili High Speed Railway Station) entered service on 28 December 2025 at 10:18 am, connecting Hi-Tech North to Shangwu (except Xili High Speed Railway Station). The Phase 2 North section opened on 28 June 2026 at 11:18 am. The Phase 2 South section is expected to open in 2027, and Xili High Speed Railway Station is expected to open in 2029. The first phase of the line is 23 km (14 mi) long and uses eight car type A trains with a maximum operating speed of 100 km/h (62 mph).

On 15 March 2026, Phase 2 North section extension of Line 13 began trial operation without passengers.

Line 13 is operated by MTR CREC Metro (Shenzhen) Company Limited, a consortium comprising MTR Consulting (Shenzhen) Co. Ltd (owns 83%), China Railway Electrification Bureau (Group) Co. Ltd (owns 15%), and a subsidiary of the Shenzhen Municipal Government (owns 2%) under a Public-Private Partnership (PPP) model for a term of 30 years.

== History ==
=== Timeline ===
Segment	Commencement	Length	Station(s)	Name
Shenzhen Bay Checkpoint — Hi-Tech Central	28 December 2024	6.36 km (3.95 mi)	7	Phase 1 South
Hi-Tech Central — Shangwu	28 December 2025	16.1 km (10.00 mi)	8	Phase 1 North
Shangwu — Lisonglang	28 June 2026	19.25 km (11.96 mi)	11	Phase 2 North
Dongjiaotou — Shenzhen Bay Checkpoint	2027 (Expected)	4.07 km (2.53 mi)	3	Phase 2 South
Xili High Speed Railway Station	2029 (Planned)	Infill station	1	Phase 1 North

== Stations ==
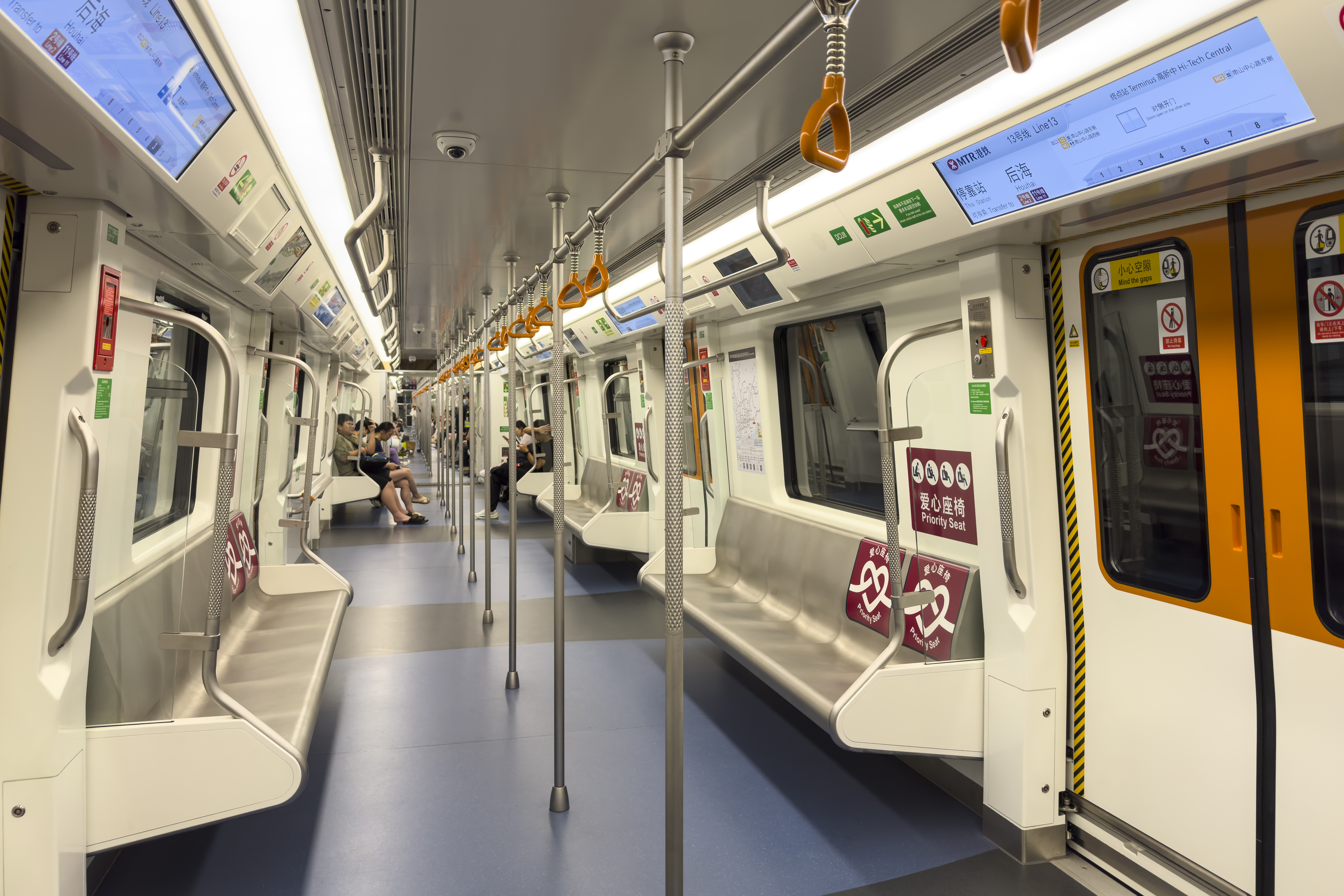
Line 13 Train car interior

Stage	Station name		Connections	Nearby bus stops	Distance km	Location
Stage	English	Chinese	Connections	Nearby bus stops	Distance km	Location
Phase 2 (Southern Extension)	Dongjiaotou	东角头	2 8			Nanshan
Phase 2 (Southern Extension)	Opera House	歌剧院				Nanshan
Phase 2 (Southern Extension)	Tide Park	潮汐公园				Nanshan
Phase 1 (South Section)	Shenzhen Bay Checkpoint	深圳湾口岸		90 E3 E19 M177 M242 M409 M484 M506 M507 M528 N73 N90		Nanshan
Phase 1 (South Section)	Talent Park	人才公园				Nanshan
Phase 1 (South Section)	Houhai	后海	2 8 11	229 B605 B615 B669 M209 M299 M467 M474 M483 M519		Nanshan
Phase 1 (South Section)	Keyuan	科苑	2 8	72 325 334 B605 E9 E19 M109 M209 M299 M467 M554 M562 Peak-express 50（高快50）Peak-express 51（高快51）Peak-express 53（高快53）Peak-time 22（高峰22）Peak-time 34（高峰34）Peak-time 92（高峰92）Peak-time 120（高峰120）Peak-time 150（高峰150）		Nanshan
Phase 1 (South Section)	Yuehaimen	粤海门	9	325 334 E9 M209 M528 M554 Peak-express 42（高快42）Peak-express 43（高快43）Peak-express 50（高快50）Peak-express 53（高快53）Peak-time 21（高峰21）Peak-time 22（高峰22）Peak-time 34（高峰34）Peak-time 92（高峰92）Peak-time 128（高峰128）Peak-time 150（高峰150）		Nanshan
Phase 1 (South Section)	Shenzhen University	深大	1 20	19 21 42 49 81 101 113 204 223 234 320 323 324 328 338 339 369 B610 B616 B668 M191 M194 M200 M358 M372 M413 M435 M448 M530 Peak-express 32（高快32）Peak-express 49（高快49）Peak-time 36（高峰36）Peak-time 128（高峰128）Peak-time 158（高峰158）Peak-time 165（高峰165）N4		Nanshan
Phase 1 (South Section)	Hi-Tech Central	高新中				Nanshan
Phase 1 (North Section)	Hi-Tech North	高新北				Nanshan
Phase 1 (North Section)	Xili High Speed Railway Station	西丽高铁站	ELQ; 15 27 29			Nanshan
Phase 1 (North Section)	Shigu	石鼓				Nanshan
Phase 1 (North Section)	Liuxiandong	留仙洞	5			Nanshan
Phase 1 (North Section)	Baiwang	百旺				Nanshan
Phase 1 (North Section)	Yingrenshi	应人石				Bao'an
Phase 1 (North Section)	Luozu	罗租				Bao'an
Phase 1 (North Section)	Shiyan	石岩				Bao'an
Phase 1 (North Section)	Shangwu	上屋	6			Bao'an
Phase 2 (Northern Extension)	Hong'ao Park	红坳公园				Guangming
Phase 2 (Northern Extension)	Guangmingcheng	光明城	6B IMQ			Guangming
Phase 2 (Northern Extension)	Deya Road	德雅路				Guangming
Phase 2 (Northern Extension)	Fenghuang Town	凤凰城	6			Guangming
Phase 2 (Northern Extension)	Yueliang Road	月亮路				Guangming
Phase 2 (Northern Extension)	Jiangwei	将围				Guangming
Phase 2 (Northern Extension)	Xinzhuang	新庄				Guangming
Phase 2 (Northern Extension)	Gongming Square	公明广场	6			Guangming
Phase 2 (Northern Extension)	Shangcun	上村				Guangming
Phase 2 (Northern Extension)	Xiacun	下村				Guangming
Phase 2 (Northern Extension)	Lisonglang	李松蓢				Guangming
