= Hi-Tech Central station =

Shenzhen Metro Line 13 station

Hi-Tech Central 高新中
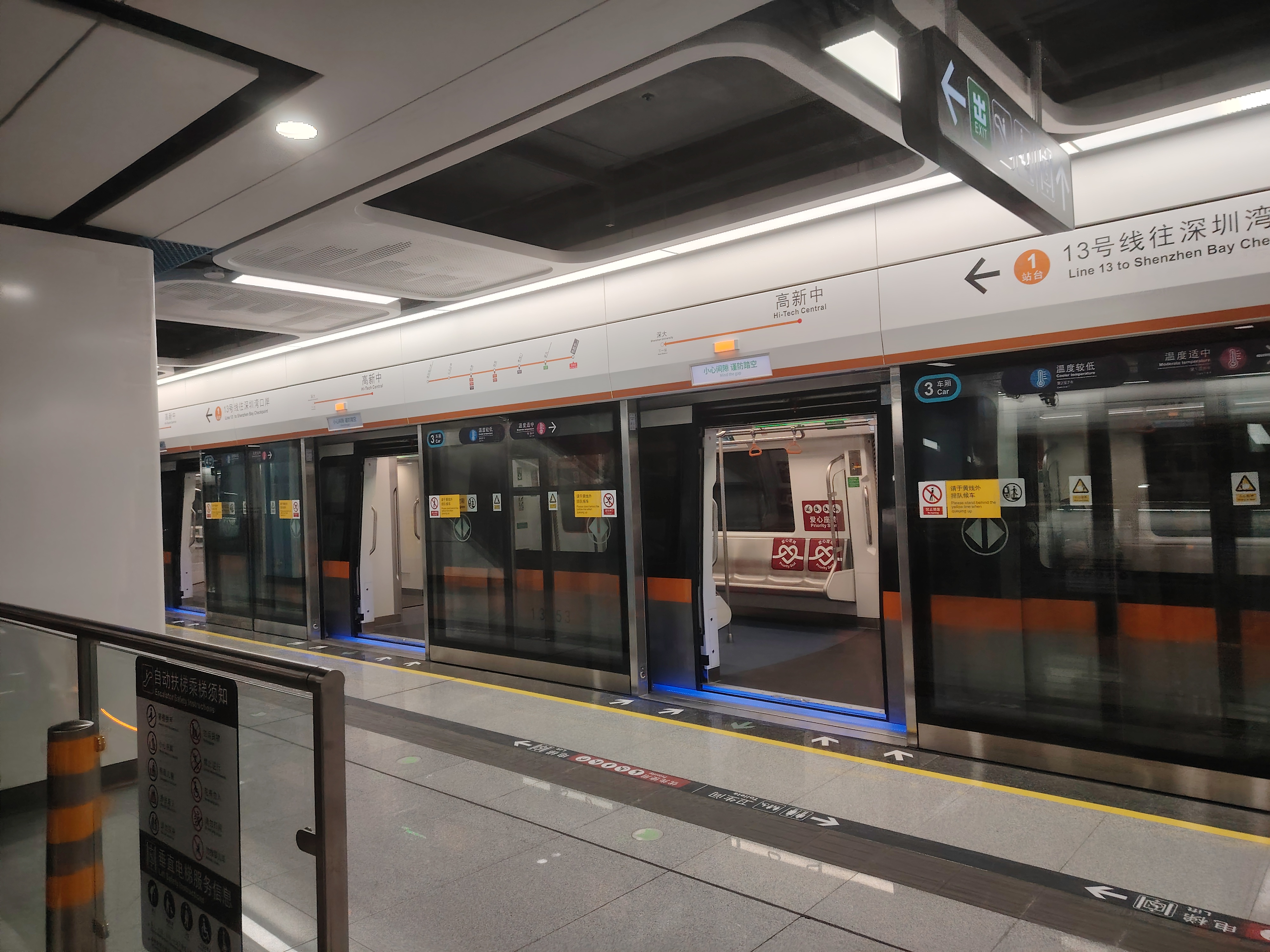
- Platform

Chinese name
- Chinese: 高新中
Transcriptions
Standard Mandarin
- Hanyu Pinyin: Gāoxīn Zhōng
Yue: Cantonese
- Yale Romanization: Gōusān Jūng
- Jyutping: Gou1 San1 Zung1

General information
- Location: Intersection of Keyuan Road (科苑路), Gaoxinzhong 2nd Road (高新中二路) and Kehua Road (科华路); Nanshan District, Shenzhen, Guangdong; China
- Coordinates: 22°33′0″N 113°56′26″E
- Operated by: MTR China Railway Electrification Rail Transit (Shenzhen) Co., Ltd (MTR Corporation (Shenzhen) Co., Ltd. and China Railway Electrification Bureau Group Co., Ltd.)
- Line: Line 13
- Platforms: 2 (1 island platform)
- Tracks: 2

Construction
- Structure type: Underground
- Accessible: Yes

History
- Opened: 28 December 2024 (18 months ago)
- Previous names: Kexing (科兴)

Services
Preceding station	Shenzhen Metro	Following station
Shenzhen University towards Shenzhen Bay Checkpoint	Line 13	Hi-Tech North towards Lisonglang
Location

Hi-Tech Central station (Chinese: 高新中站; pinyin: Gāoxīnzhōng Zhàn; Cantonese Yale: Gōusān Jūng Jaahm) is a station on Line 13 of Shenzhen Metro. It opened on 28 December 2024. It was the northern terminus of the line until the extension to Shangwu opened on 28 December 2025.

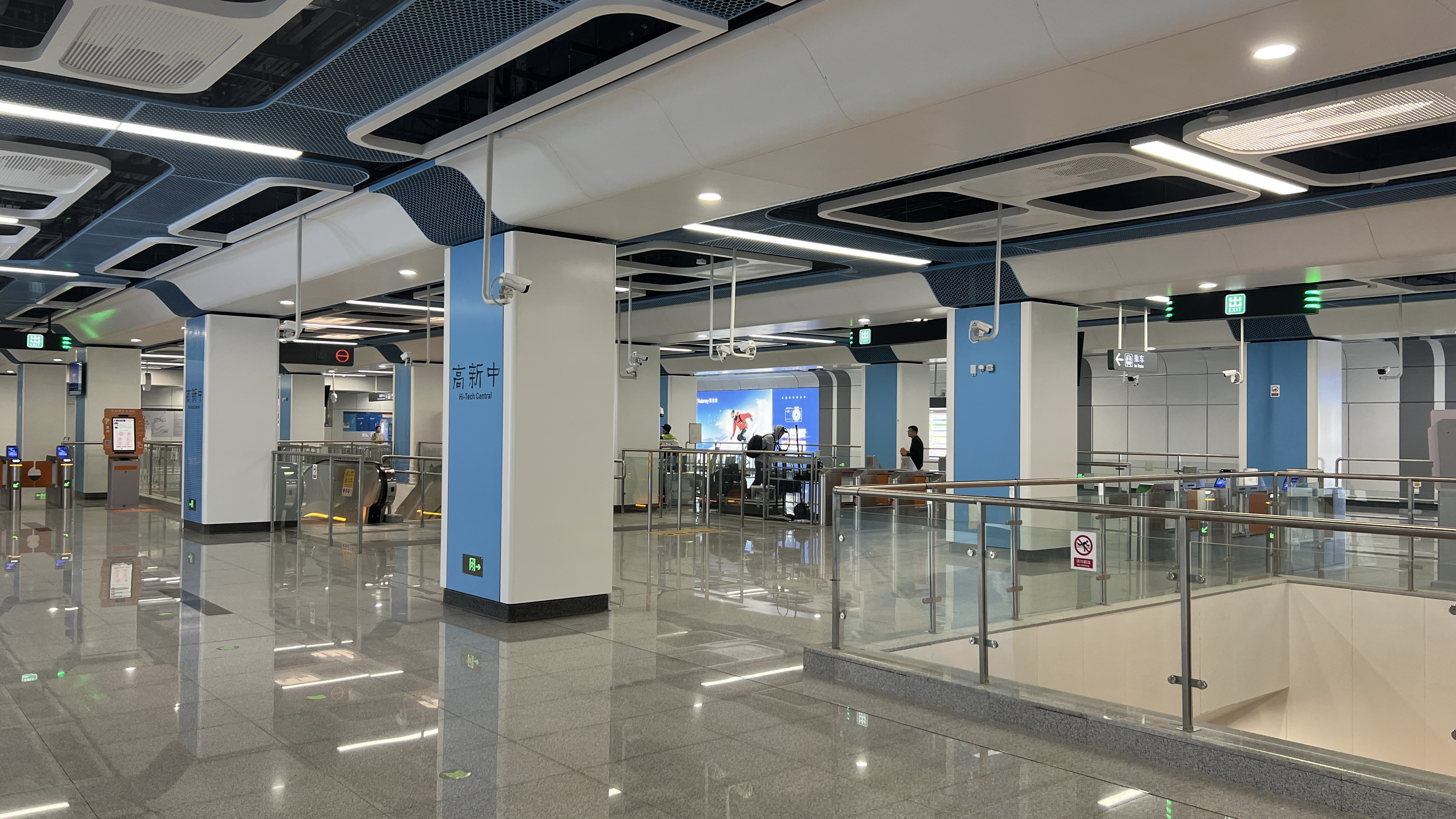
Concourse

== Station layout ==
G	-	Exits A, C, D
B1F; Concourse	Lobby	Ticket Machines, Customer Service, Station Control Room
B2F; Platforms	Platform 1	13 towards Shenzhen Bay Checkpoint (Shenzhen University)
B2F; Platforms	Island platform, doors will open on the left
B2F; Platforms	Platform 2	13 towards Lisonglang (Hi-Tech North)

=== Entrances/exits ===
The station has 3 points of entry/exit. Exit A is equipped with an elevator and a toilet.

- : Keyuan North Road (E-S), Xunmei Building
- : Keyuan North Road (W-N), Kexing Science and Technology Park
- : Keyuan North Road (W-S), Kexing Science and Technology Park
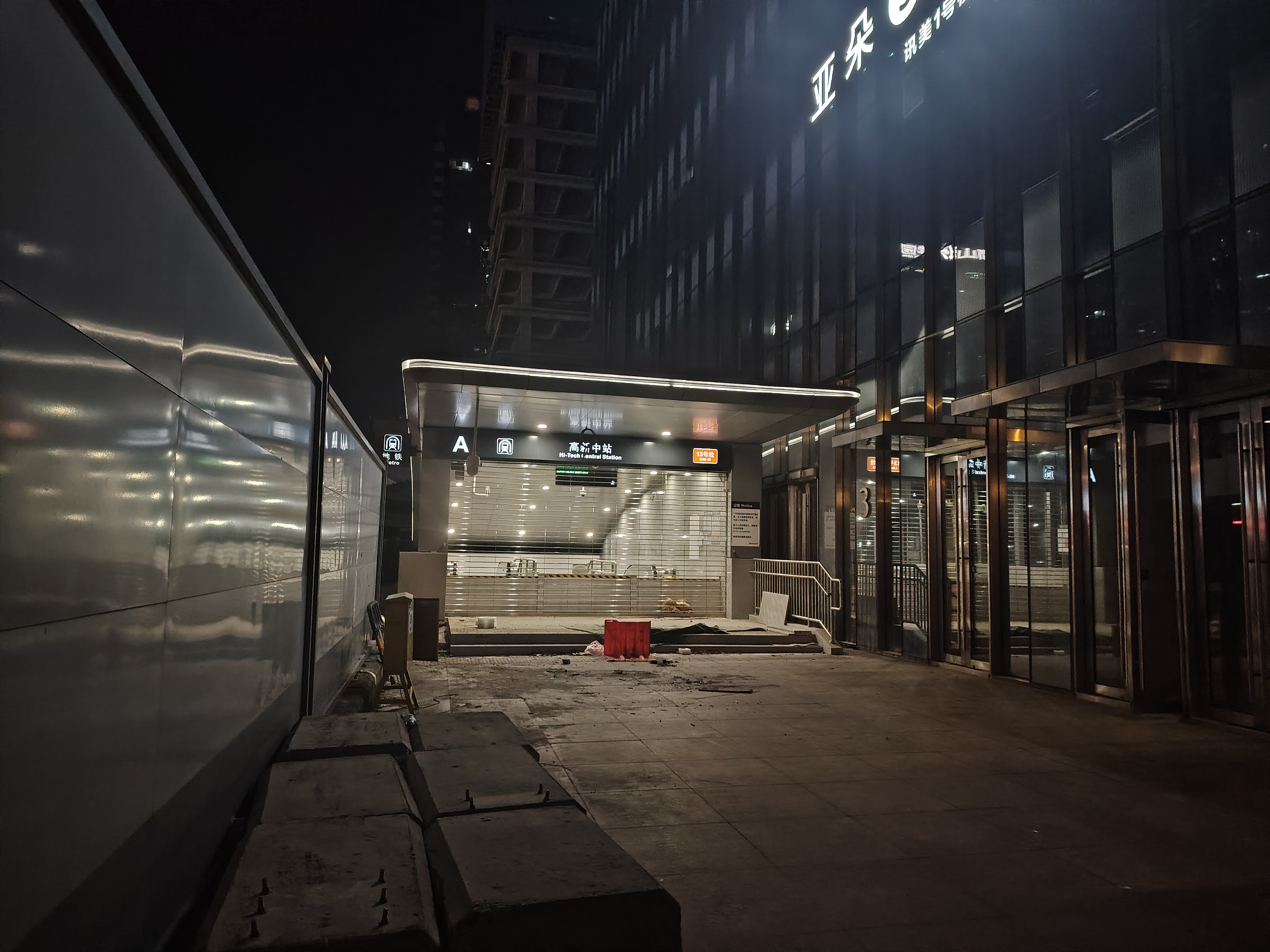
Entrance A

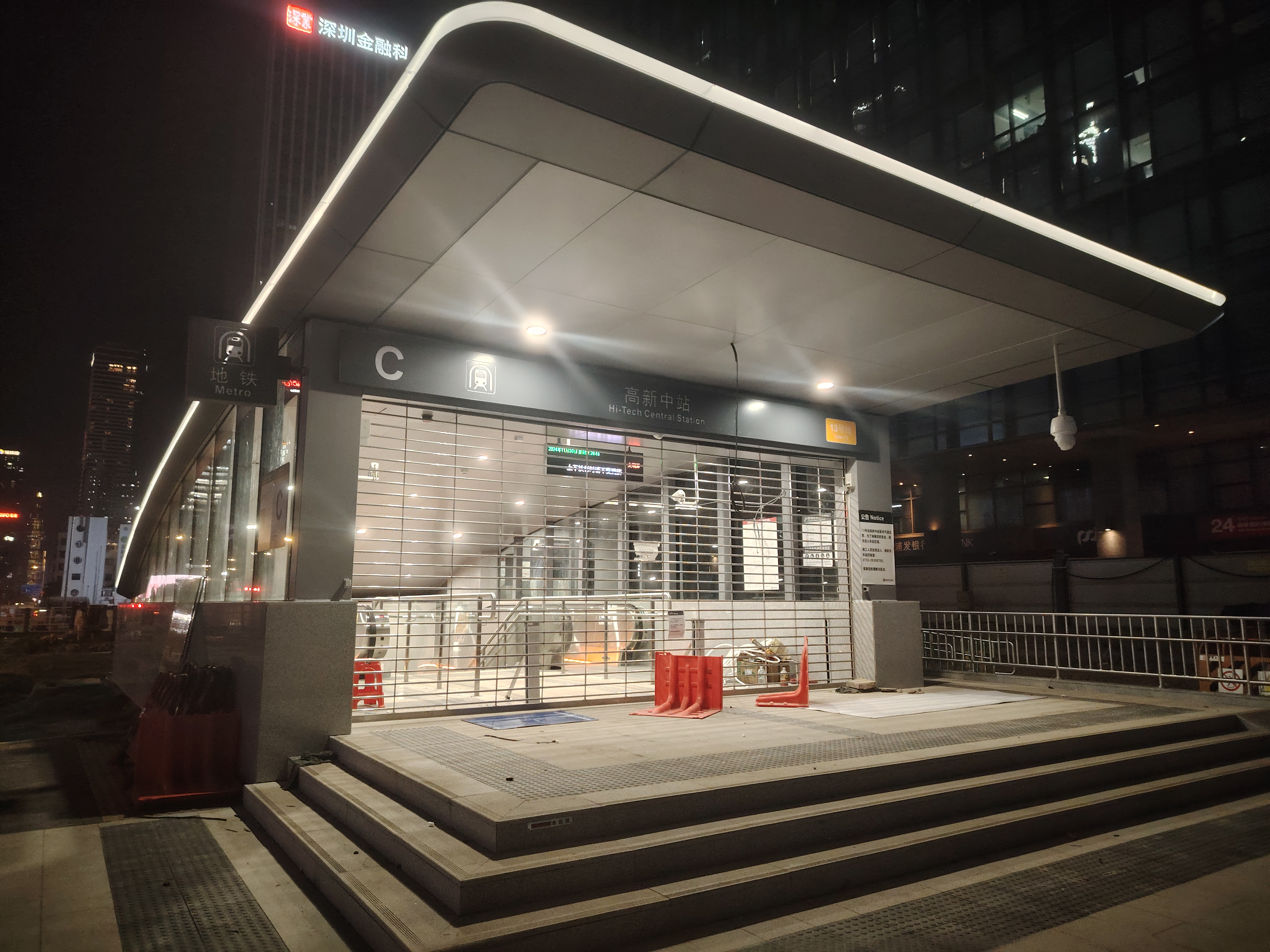
Entrance C

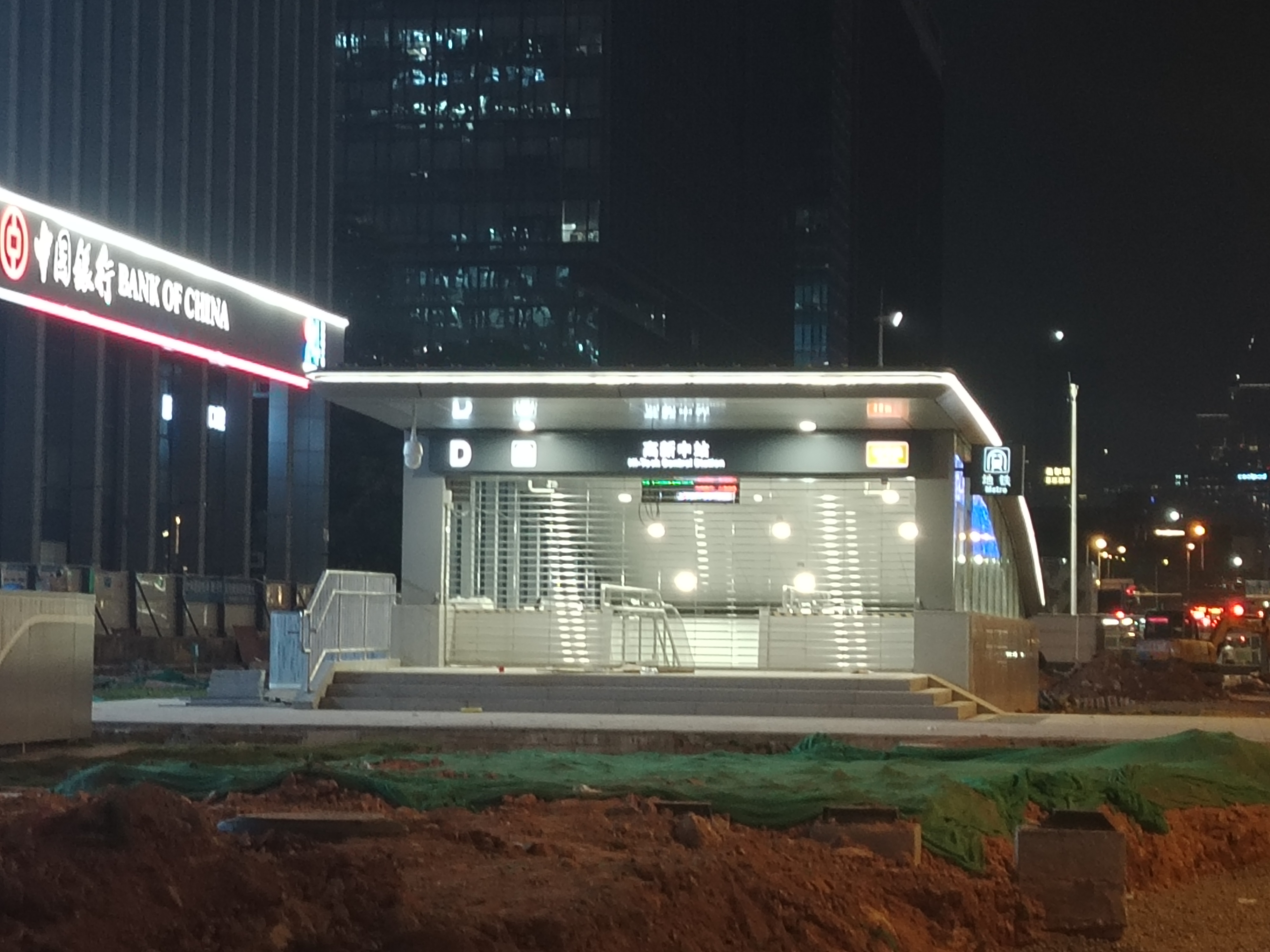
Entrance D

== Construction timeline ==
- On 26 July 2017, Shenzhen Metro Group Co., Ltd. issued the "Environmental Impact Report of Shenzhen Urban Rail Transit Line 13 Project", which includes this station, and the project is named Kexing Station.
- On 20 February 2019, the construction of this station officially started.
- On 19 August 2019, the first acceptance of the reinforcement cage of the connecting wall of the station was successfully passed.
- On September 30, 2019, the construction of the main power pipeline of the station was successfully completed.
- On April 27, 2020, the cutover of the last power pipeline of the station was successfully completed.
- On February 20, 2021, the acceptance of the excavation conditions of the 1-17 axis deep foundation pit of the station was successfully passed, marking that the station has fully entered the earthwork excavation stage.
- On April 22, 2022, the Shenzhen Municipal Bureau of Planning and Natural Resources issued the Announcement on the Approval of the Plan for the Station Names of Relevant Lines of the Fourth Phase of Shenzhen Metro, and the station was renamed from "Kexing Station" to the official station name, "Hi-Tech Central Station".
