= Yuehaimen station =

Metro station in Shenzhen, Guangdong, China

Yuehaimen 粤海门
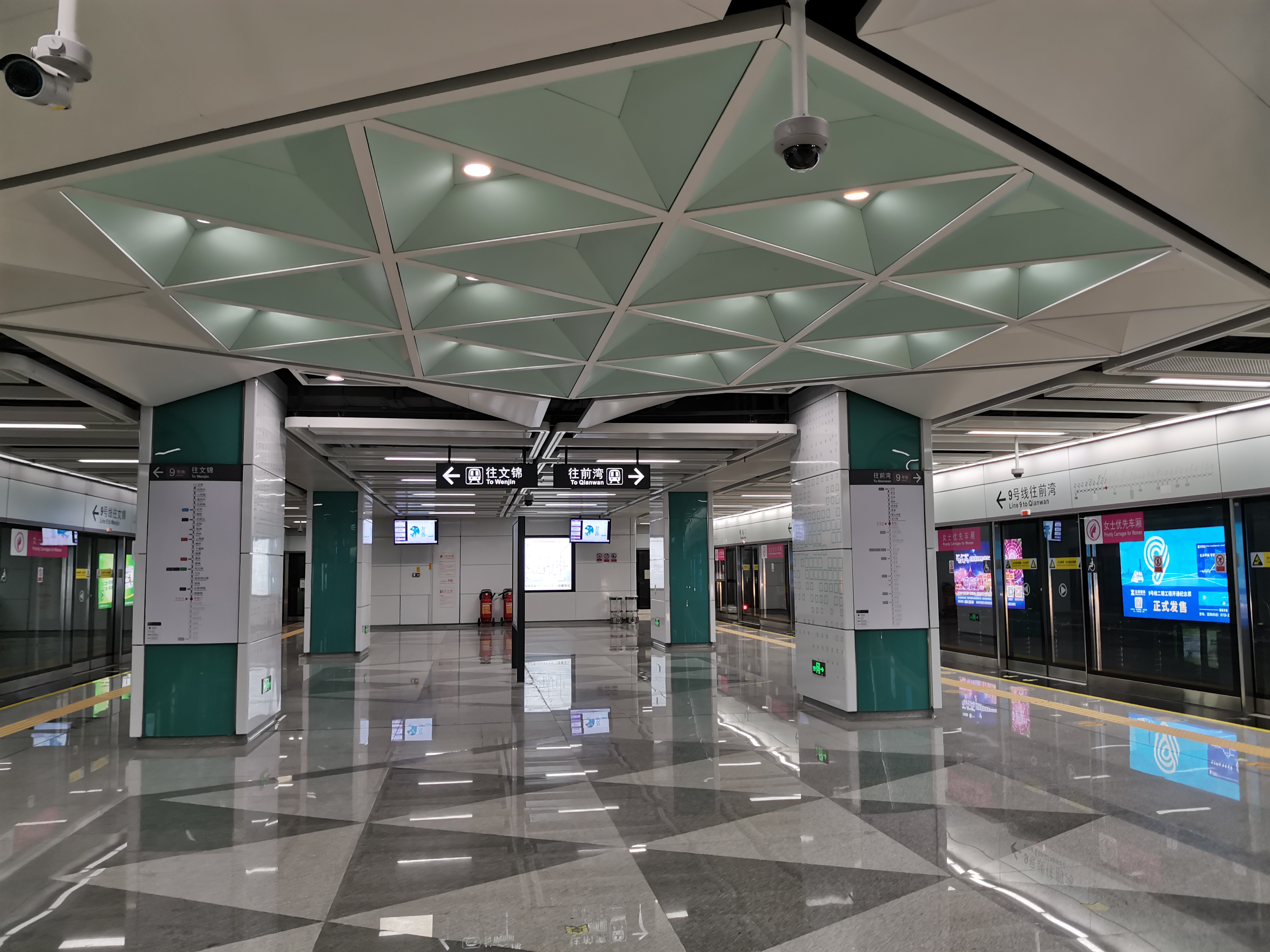
- Line 9 platform

General information
- Location: Nanshan District, Shenzhen, Guangdong; China
- Coordinates: 22°31′46″N 113°59′6″E
- Operated by: SZMC (Shenzhen Metro Group); MTR China Railway Electrification Rail Transit (Shenzhen) Co., Ltd (MTR Rail Transit (Shenzhen) Co., Ltd. and China Railway Electrification Bureau Group Co., Ltd.)
- Lines: Line 9 Line 13
- Platforms: 4 (2 island platforms)
- Tracks: 4

Construction
- Structure type: Underground
- Accessible: Yes

History
- Opened: Line 9: 8 December 2019 (6 years ago); Line 13: 28 December 2024 (18 months ago)

Services
Preceding station	Shenzhen Metro	Following station
Hi-Tech South towards Wenjin	Line 9	Shenzhen University South towards Qianwan
Keyuan towards Shenzhen Bay Checkpoint	Line 13	Shenzhen University towards Lisonglang
Location

Yuehaimen station (simplified Chinese: 粤海门站; traditional Chinese: 粵海門站; pinyin: Yuèhǎimén Zhàn; Jyutping: jyut6 hoi2 mun4 zaam6) is an interchange station between Line 9 and Line 13 of Shenzhen Metro. The Line 9 station opened on 8 December 2019, and the Line 13 station opened on 28 December 2024.
