= Shigu station =

Shenzhen Metro Line 13 station

Shigu 石鼓
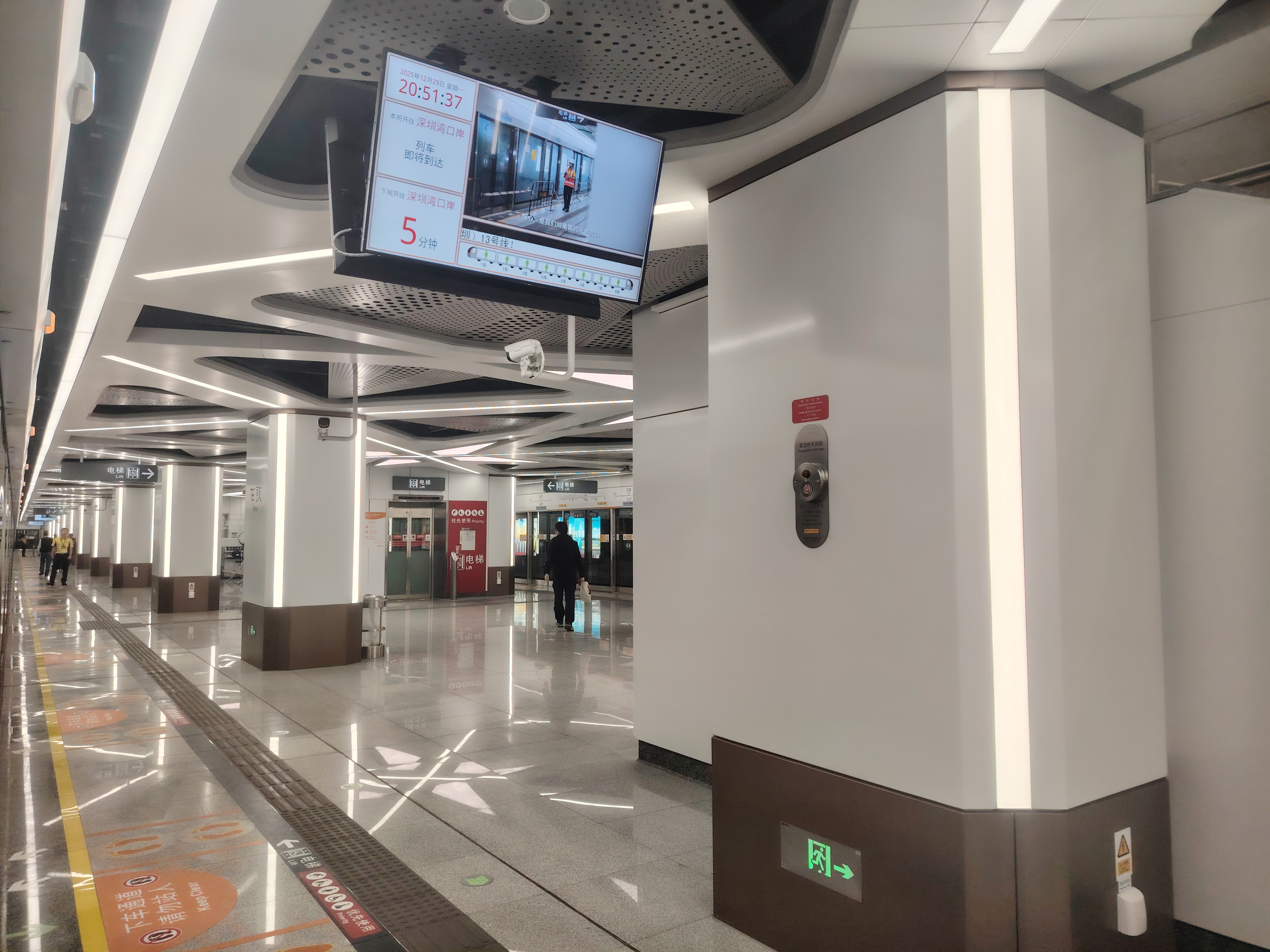
- Platform

Chinese name
- Chinese: 石鼓
Transcriptions
Standard Mandarin
- Hanyu Pinyin: Shígǔ
Yue: Cantonese
- Yale Romanization: Sehkgú
- Jyutping: sek6 gu2

General information
- Location: Tongfa South Road (同发南路), located between Dashi 2nd Road (打石二路) and Liuxin 1st Road (留新一路); Xili Subdistrict, Nanshan District, Shenzhen, Guangdong; China
- Coordinates: 22°34′41″N 113°56′21″E
- Operated by: MTR China Railway Electrification Rail Transit (Shenzhen) Co., Ltd (MTR Rail Transit (Shenzhen) Co., Ltd. and China Railway Electrification Bureau Group Co., Ltd.)
- Line: Line 13
- Platforms: 2 (1 island platform)
- Tracks: 2

Construction
- Structure type: Underground
- Accessible: Yes

History
- Opened: 28 December 2025 (6 months ago)
- Previous names: Chaguang (茶光)

Services
Preceding station	Shenzhen Metro	Following station
Hi-Tech North towards Shenzhen Bay Checkpoint	Line 13	Liuxiandong towards Lisonglang
Location

Shigu station (Chinese: 石鼓站; pinyin: Shígǔ Zhàn; Cantonese Yale: Sehkgú Jaahm) is a station on Line 13 of Shenzhen Metro. It opened on 28 December 2025, and is located in Xili Subdistrict in Nanshan District.

== Station layout ==
G	-	Exits A1, B, C, D1, D2
M	-	(Exits A2, B, C, D2) Mezzanine (Note: The exit mezzanines are not connected to each other.)
B1F	South Exit Mezzanine	Toilets, Nursery
B1F	North Exit Mezzanine	-
B2F; Concourse	Lobby	Ticket Machines, Customer Service, Station Control Room
B3F; Platforms	Platform 1	13 towards Shenzhen Bay Checkpoint (Hi-Tech North)
B3F; Platforms	Island platform, doors will open on the left
B3F; Platforms	Platform 2	13 towards Lisonglang (Liuxiandong)

=== Gallery ===
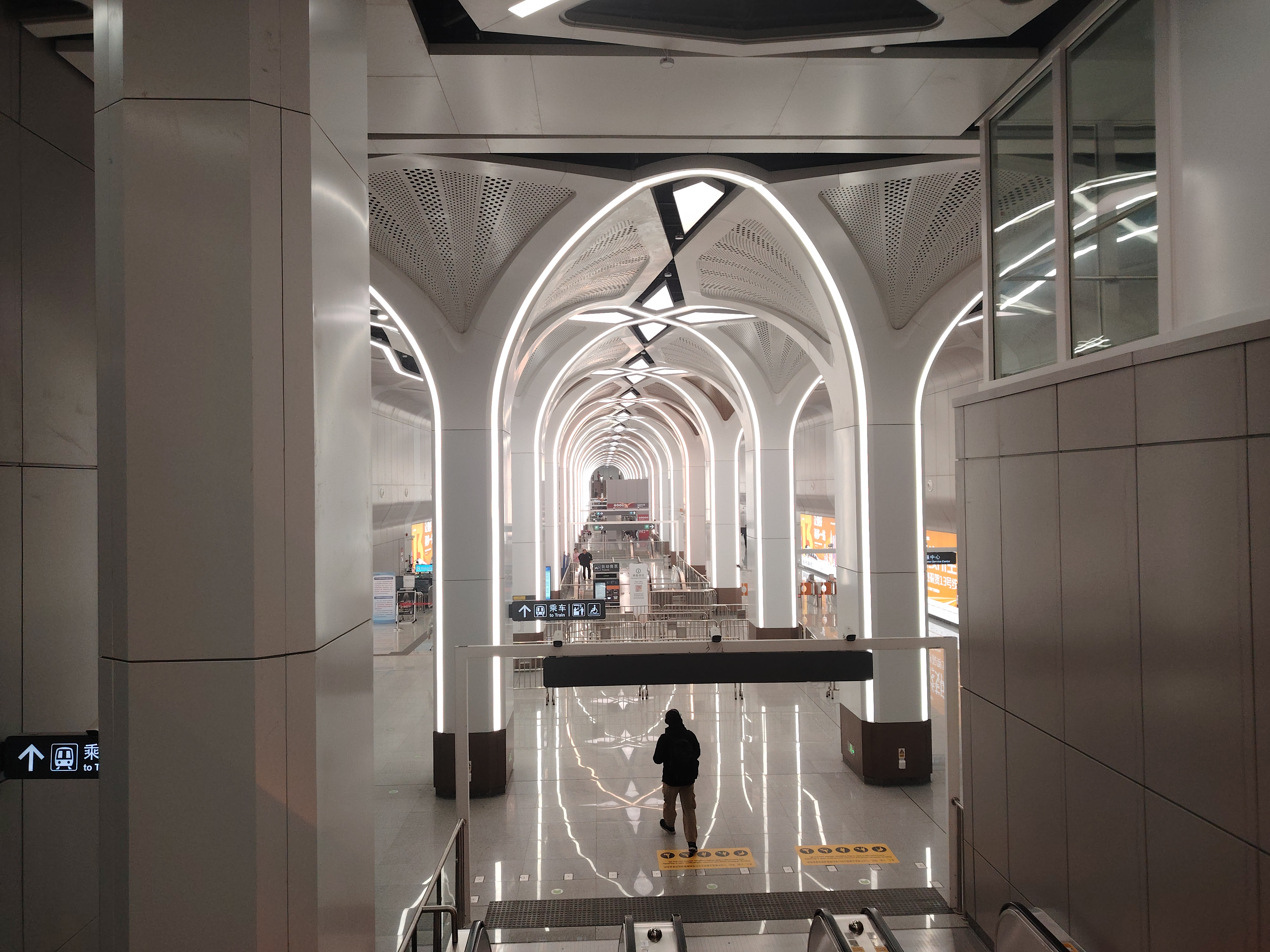
Concourse

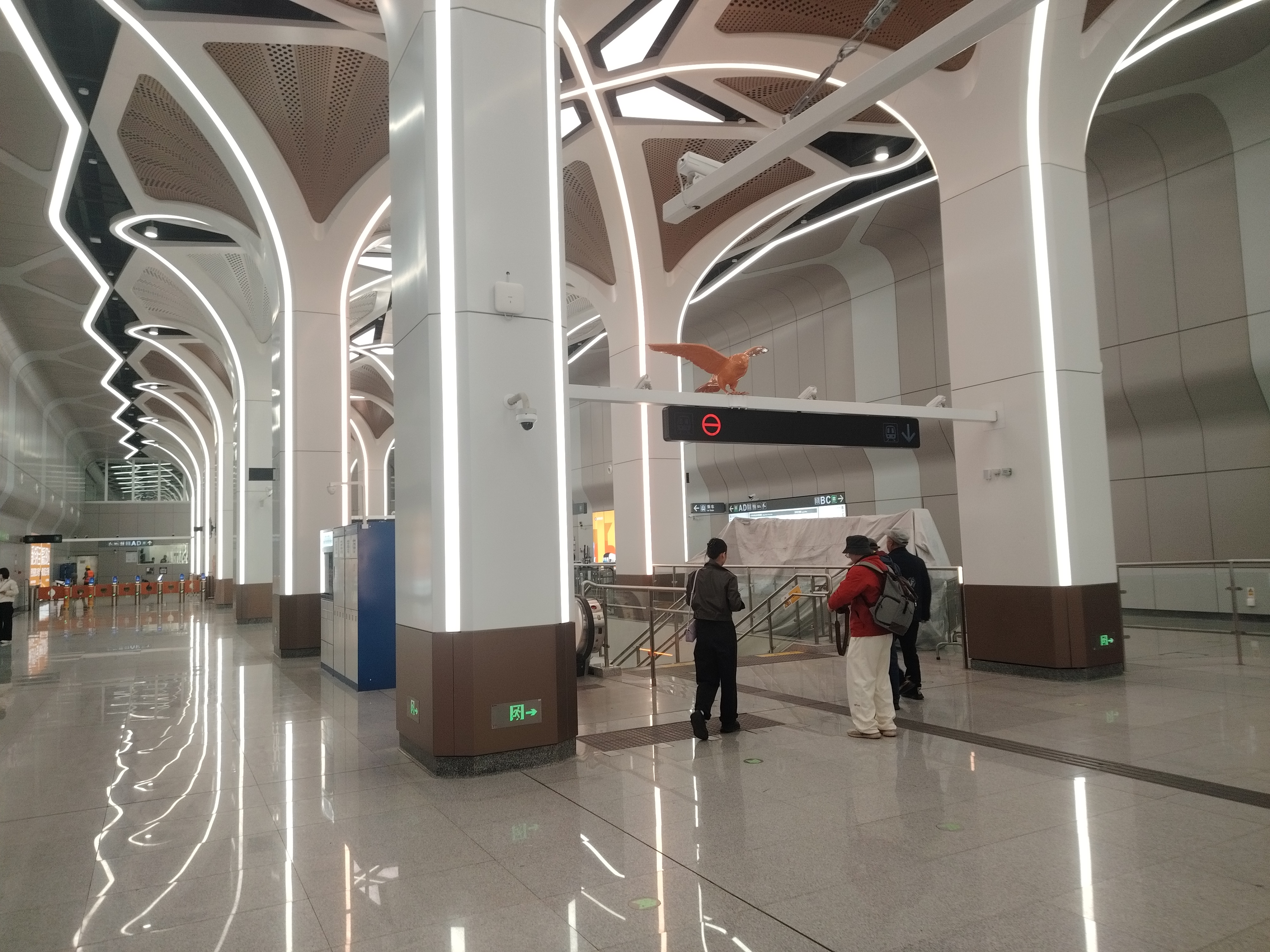
A section of the concourse

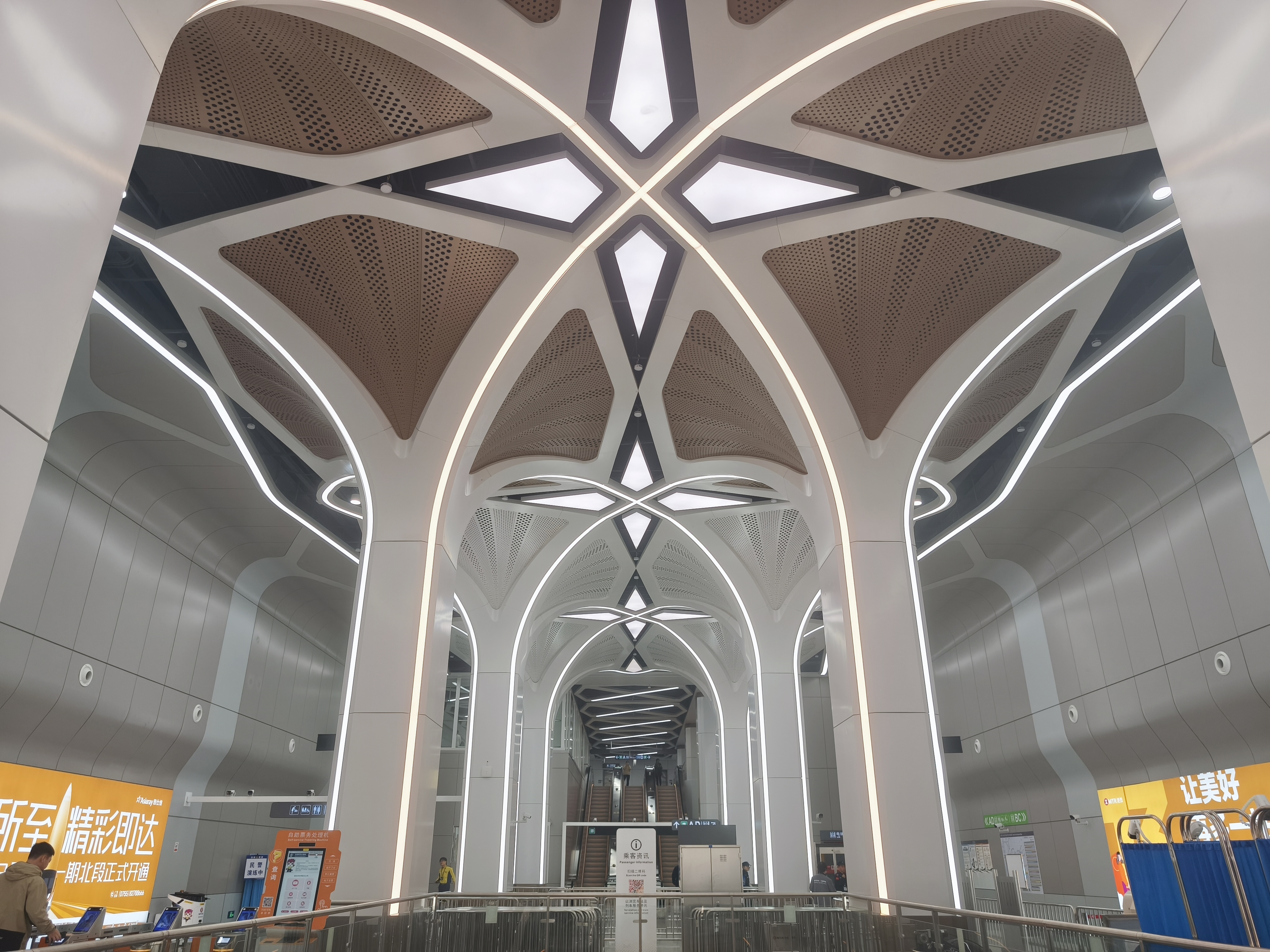
Concourse alternate view

=== Entrances/exits ===
The station has 6 points of entry/exit. Exits B and D1 are equipped with elevators.

- : Tongfa South Road, Liuxin 1st Road, Vanke Cloud City Phase VI, Nanshan Cloud Technology Building
- : Dashi 2nd Road, Tongfa South Road, Xiangu Road, Vanke Cloud City Design Commune Area D
- : Dashi 2nd Road, Tongfa South Road, Xiancha Road, Vanke Cloud City Design Commune Area C
- : Tongfa South Road, Liuxin First Road, Dashi First Road, Vanke Cloud City Phase V, Xili Subdistrict Convenience Service Center
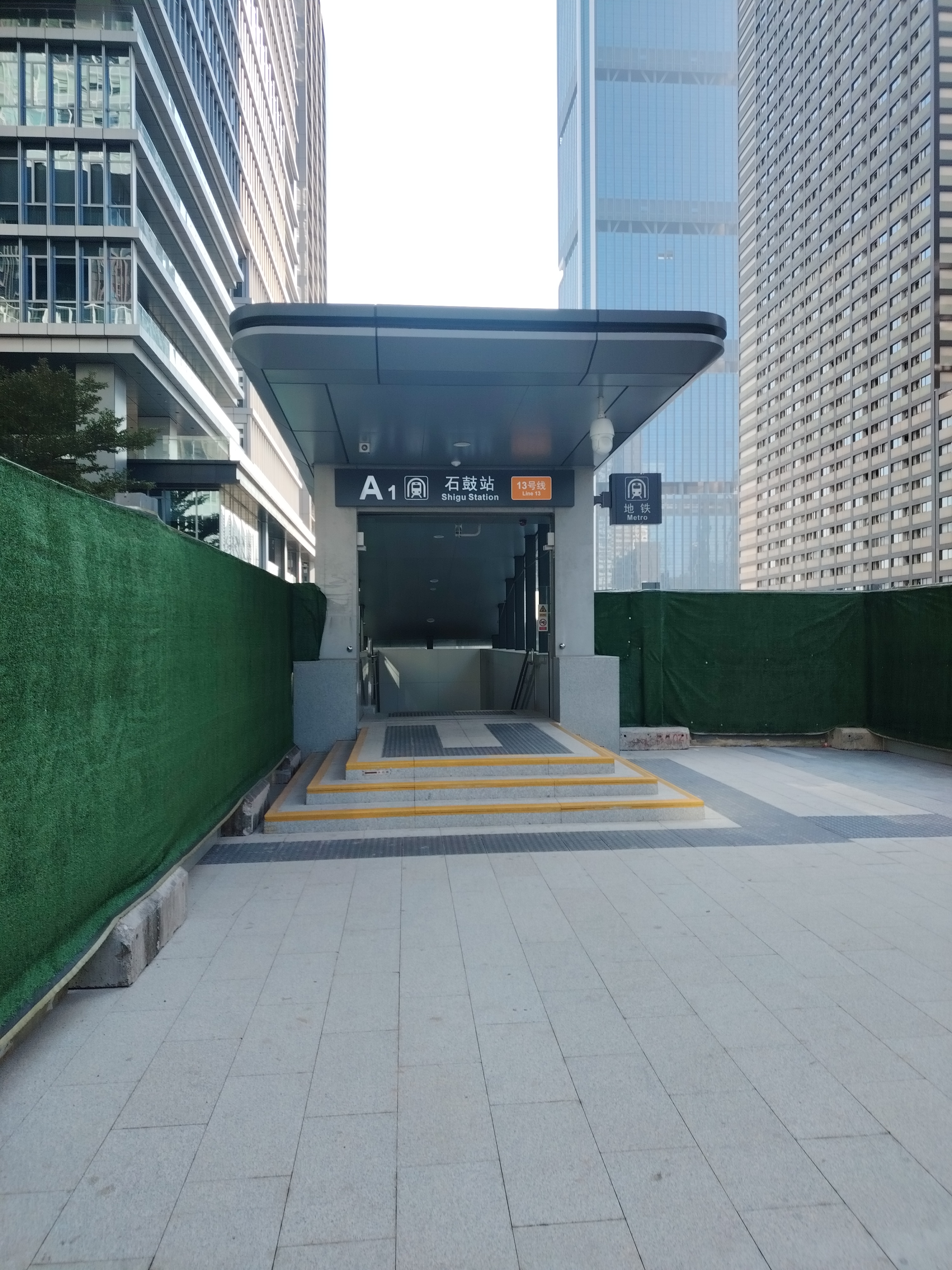
Entrance A1

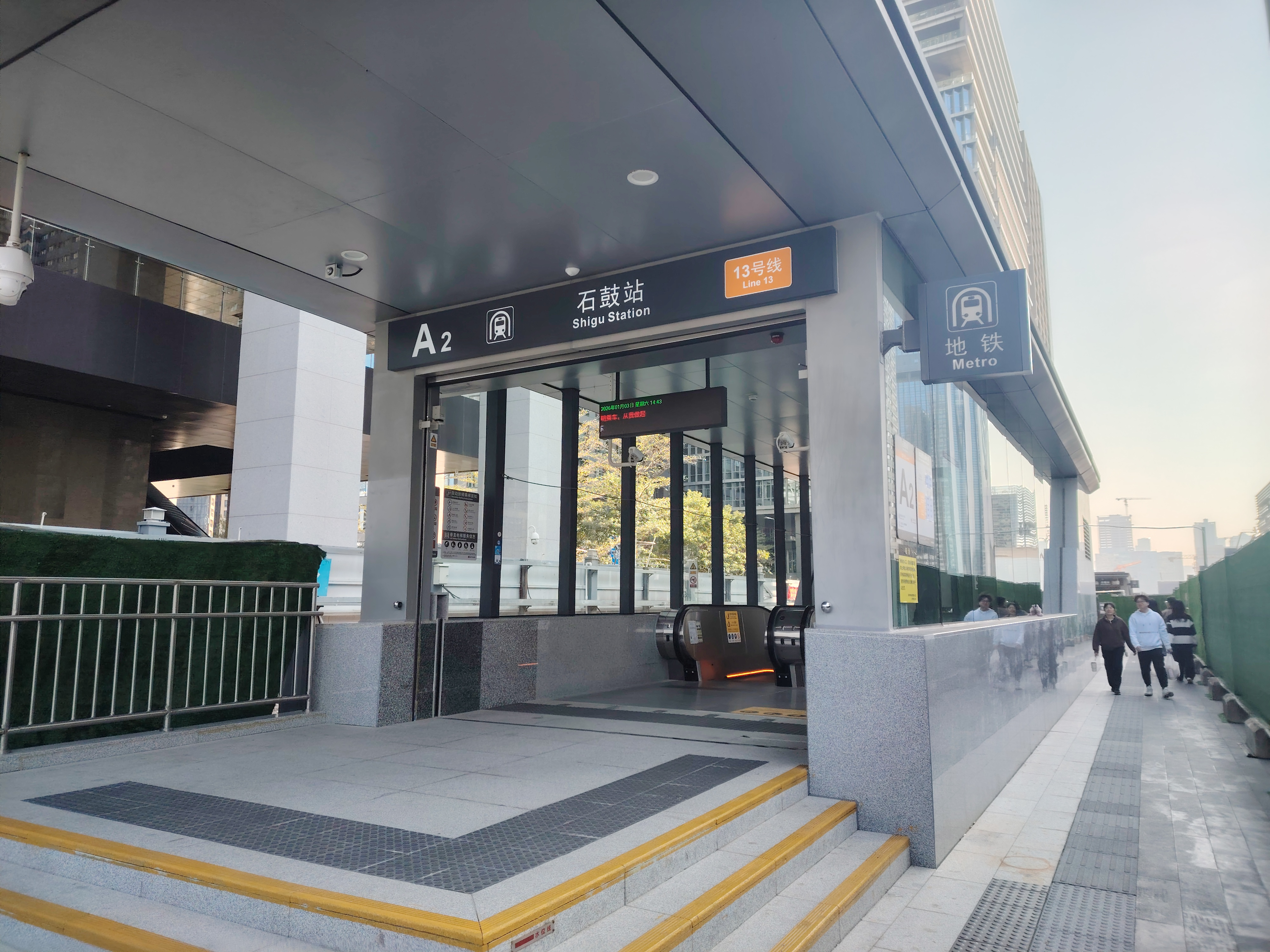
Entrance A2

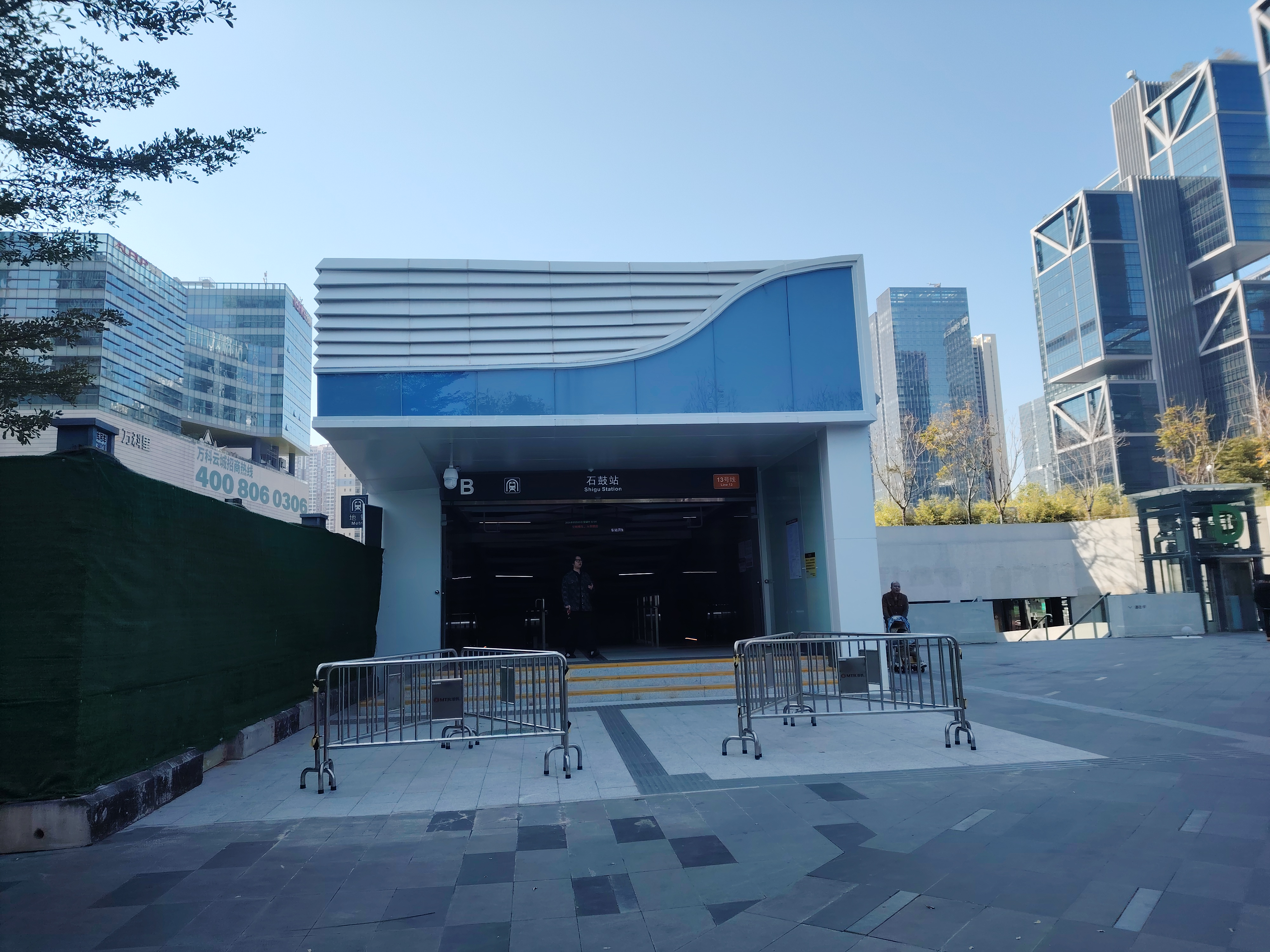
Entrance B

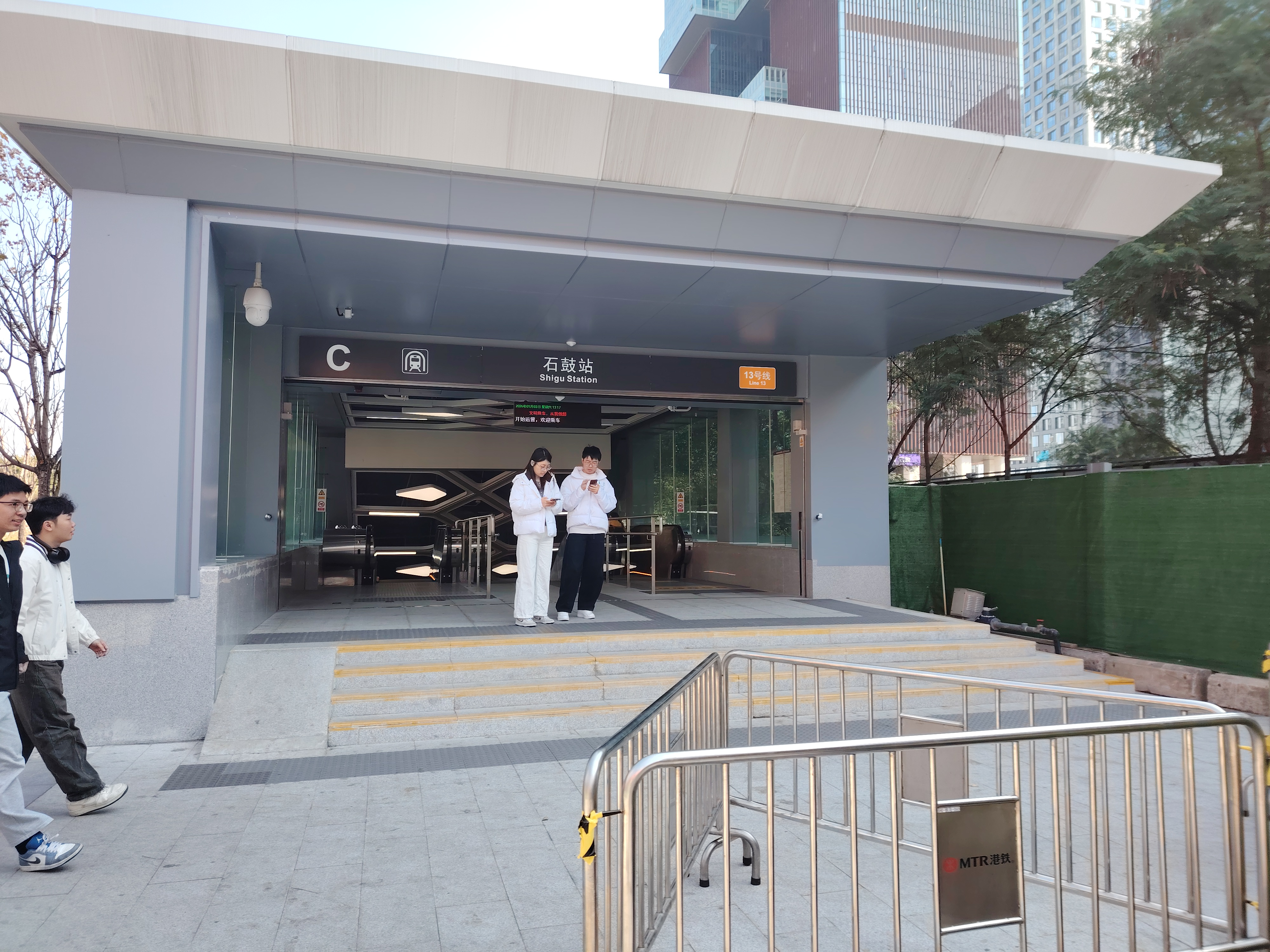
Entrance C

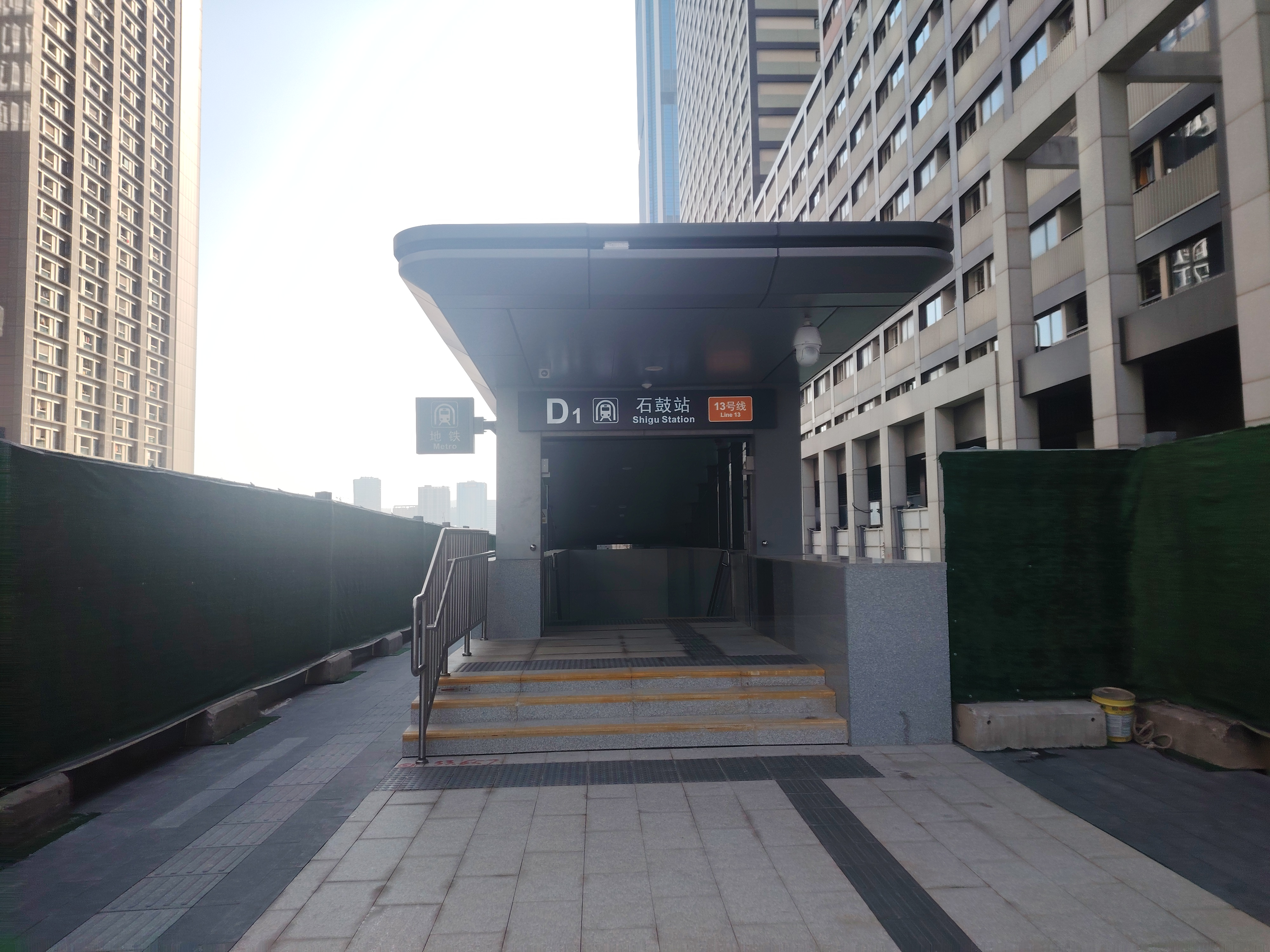
Entrance D1

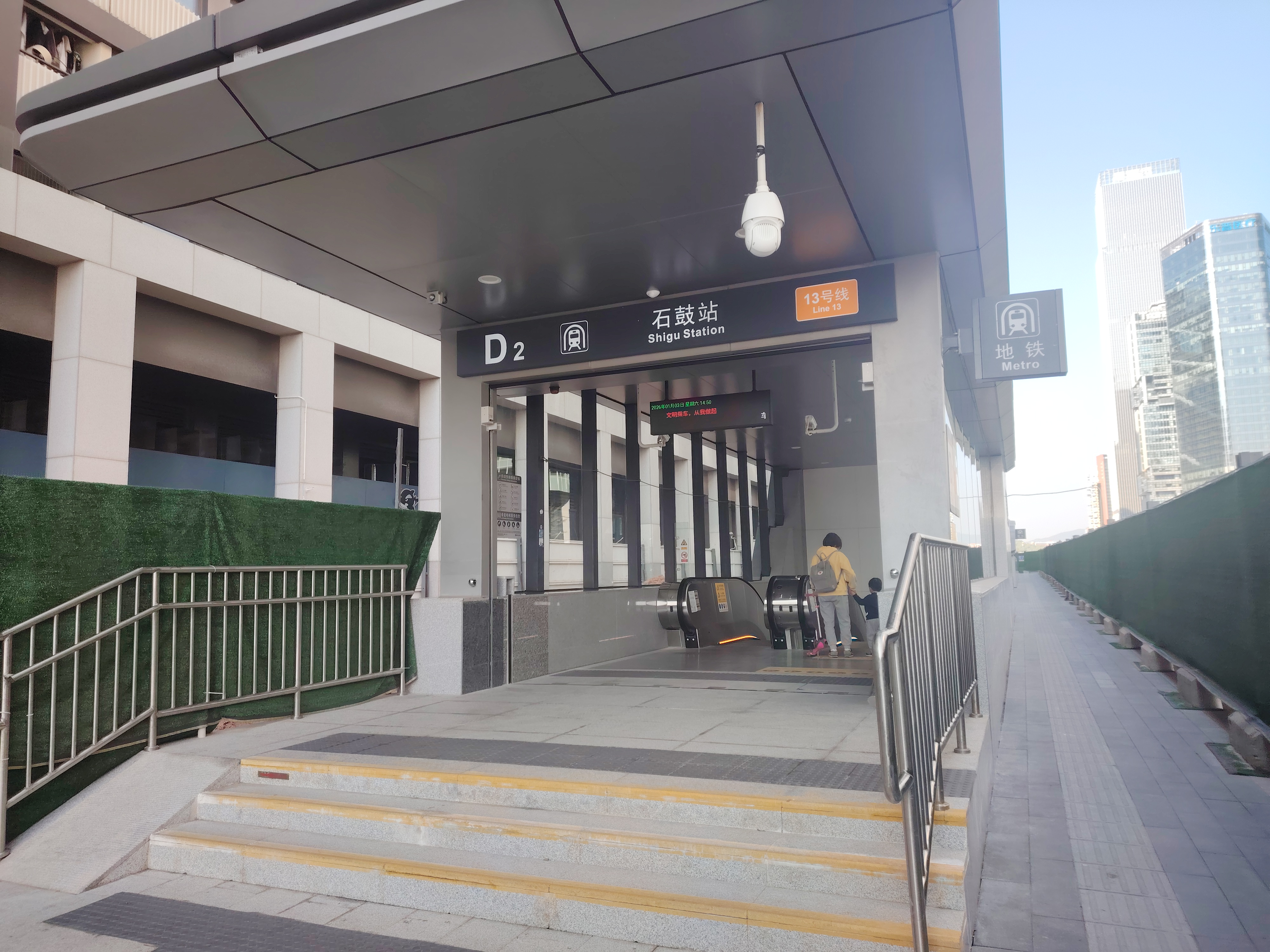
Entrance D2

== Construction timeline ==
- On 26 July 2017, Shenzhen Metro Group Co., Ltd. issued the "Environmental Impact Report of Shenzhen Urban Rail Transit Line 13 Project", which includes this station, and the project was named Chaguang Station.
- On 22 April 2022, the Shenzhen Municipal Bureau of Planning and Natural Resources issued the Announcement on the Approval of the Plan for the Station Names of Relevant Lines of the Fourth Phase of Shenzhen Metro, and the station was renamed from "Chaguang Station" to the official station name, "Shigu Station".
- On 28 December 2025, the station officially opened along with the new stations of Line 13's Phase 1 North Section (except Xili HSR station).
