= Luozu station =

Shenzhen Metro Line 13 station

Luozu 罗租
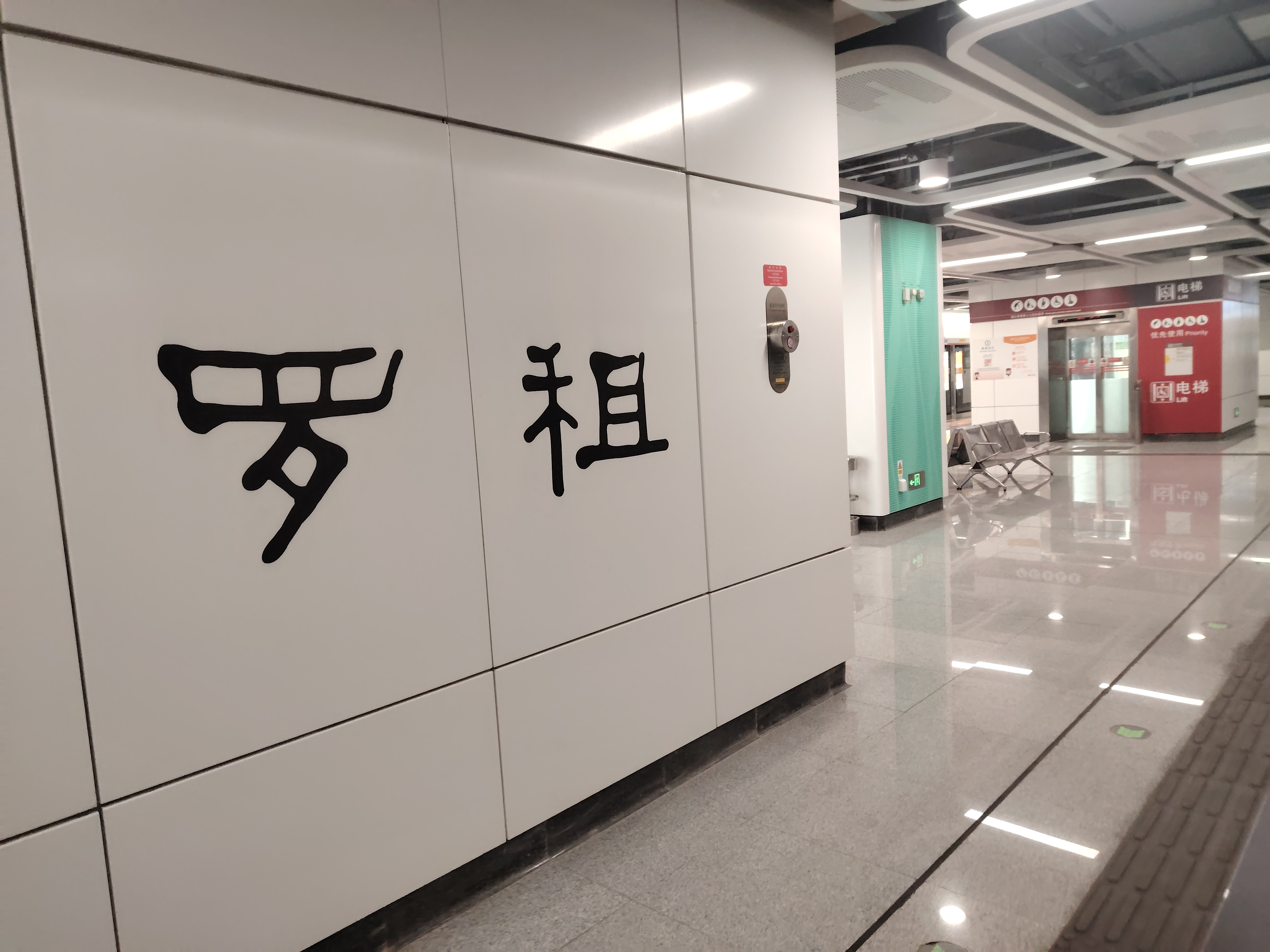
- Platform

Chinese name
- Simplified Chinese: 罗租
- Traditional Chinese: 羅租
Transcriptions
Standard Mandarin
- Hanyu Pinyin: Luózū
Yue: Cantonese
- Yale Romanization: Lòjōu
- Jyutping: Lo4 Zou1

General information
- Location: Intersection of Huangfengling Industrial Avenue (黄峰岭工业大道) and Tonghui Road (天宝路); Shiyan Subdistrict, Bao'an District, Shenzhen, Guangdong; China
- Coordinates: 22°40′15″N 113°55′43″E
- Operated by: MTR China Railway Electrification Rail Transit (Shenzhen) Co., Ltd (MTR Rail Transit (Shenzhen) Co., Ltd. and China Railway Electrification Bureau Group Co., Ltd.)
- Line: Line 13
- Platforms: 2 (1 island platform)
- Tracks: 2

Construction
- Structure type: Underground
- Accessible: Yes

History
- Opened: 28 December 2025 (6 months ago)

Services
Preceding station	Shenzhen Metro	Following station
Yingrenshi towards Shenzhen Bay Checkpoint	Line 13	Shiyan towards Lisonglang
Location

Luozu station (Chinese: 罗租站; pinyin: Luózū Zhàn; Cantonese Yale: Lòjōu Jaahm) is a station on Line 13 of Shenzhen Metro. It opened 28 December 2025 and is located in Shiyan Subdistrict in Bao'an District.

== Station layout ==
G	-	Exits A-F
B1F; Concourse	Lobby	Ticket Machines, Customer Service, Station Control Room
B2F; Platforms	Platform 1	13 towards Shenzhen Bay Checkpoint (Yingrenshi)
B2F; Platforms	Island platform, doors will open on the left
B2F; Platforms	Platform 2	13 towards Lisonglang (Shiyan)

=== Gallery ===
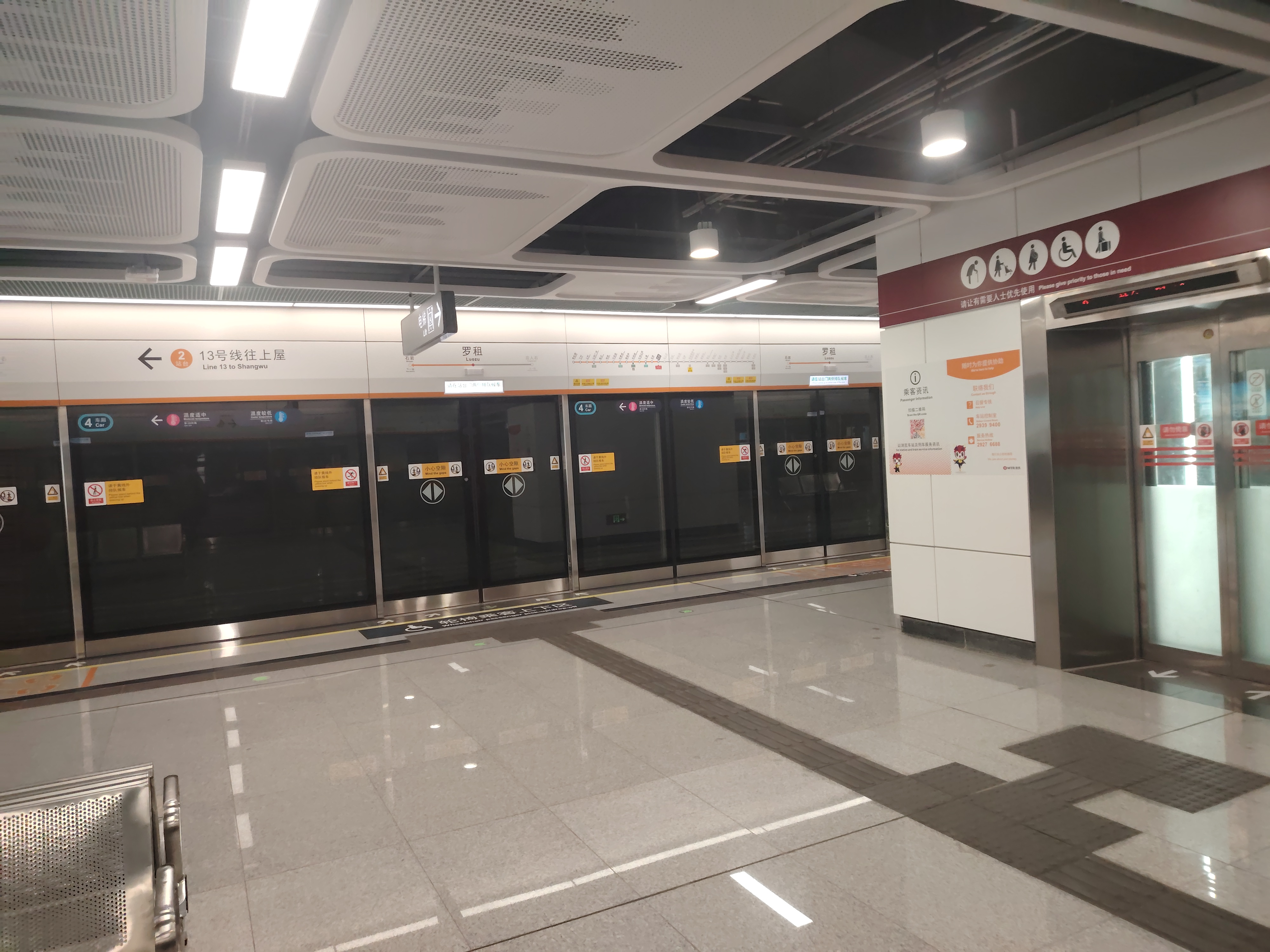
Platform

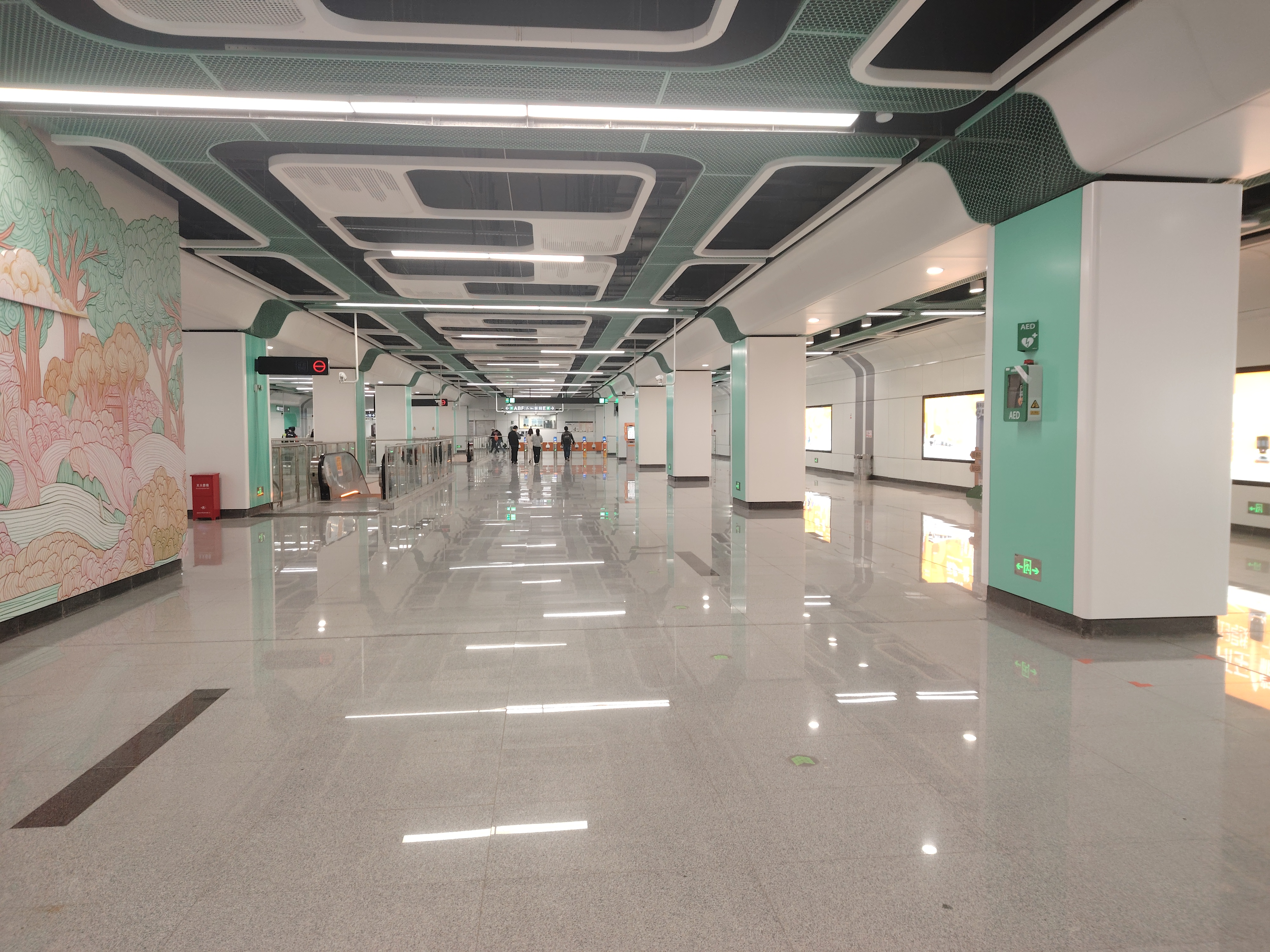
Concourse

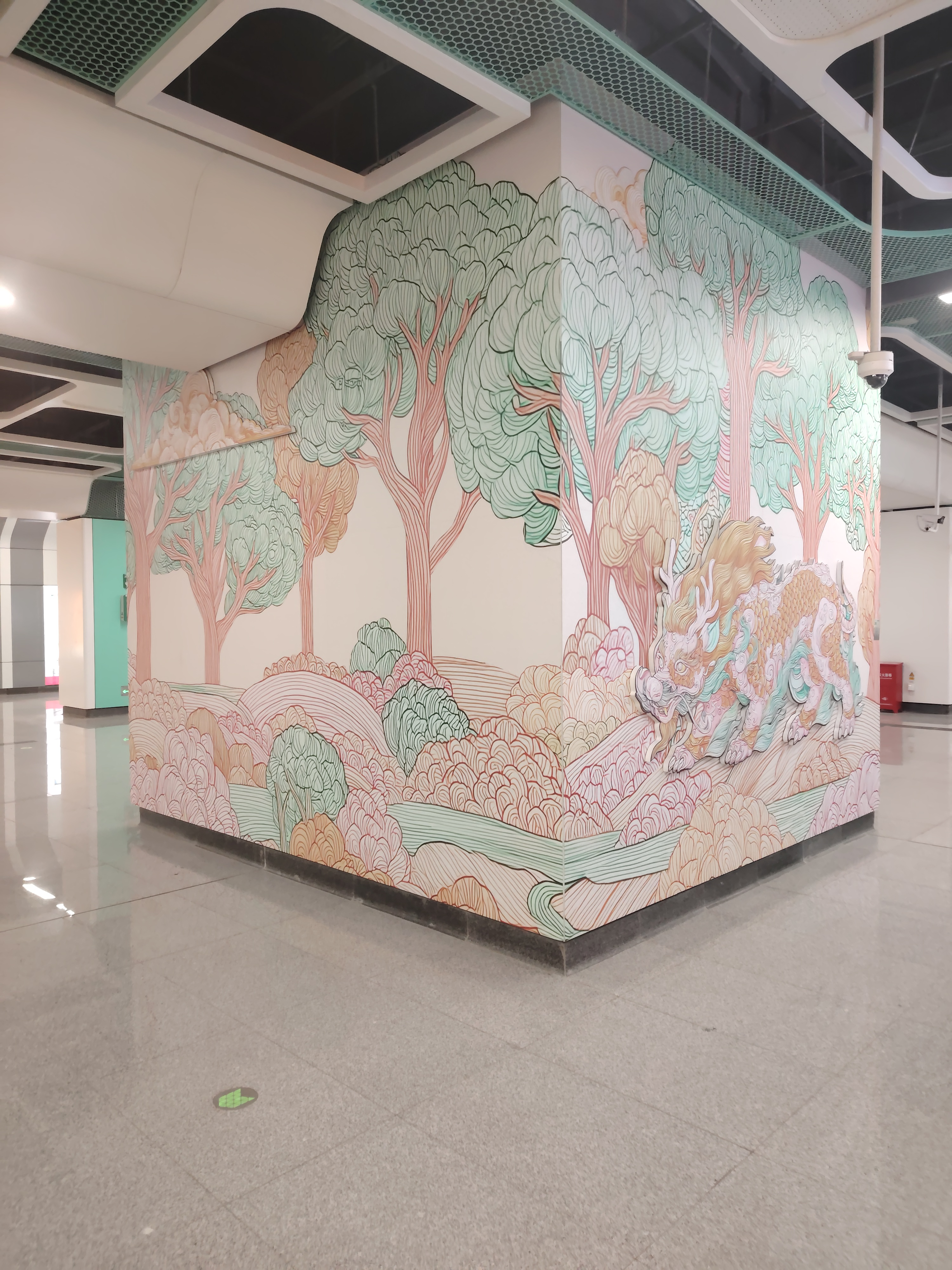
Art wall

=== Entrances/exits ===
The station has 6 points of entry/exit. Exits A and C are equipped with elevators.

- : Huangfengling Industrial Avenue, Shiqing Avenue, Emmett Electric
- : Huangfengling Industrial Avenue, Shiqing Avenue, Huanyuda Industrial Zone
- : Huangfengling Industrial Avenue, Tonghui Road, Luozu Village
- : Huangfengling Industrial Avenue, Zhoushi Road, Luozu Industrial Park
- : Huangfengling Industrial Avenue, Jianshe 2nd Road, Luozu Village, Luozu Primary School
- : Huangfengling Industrial Avenue, Zhoushi Road, Huangfengling Industrial Zone
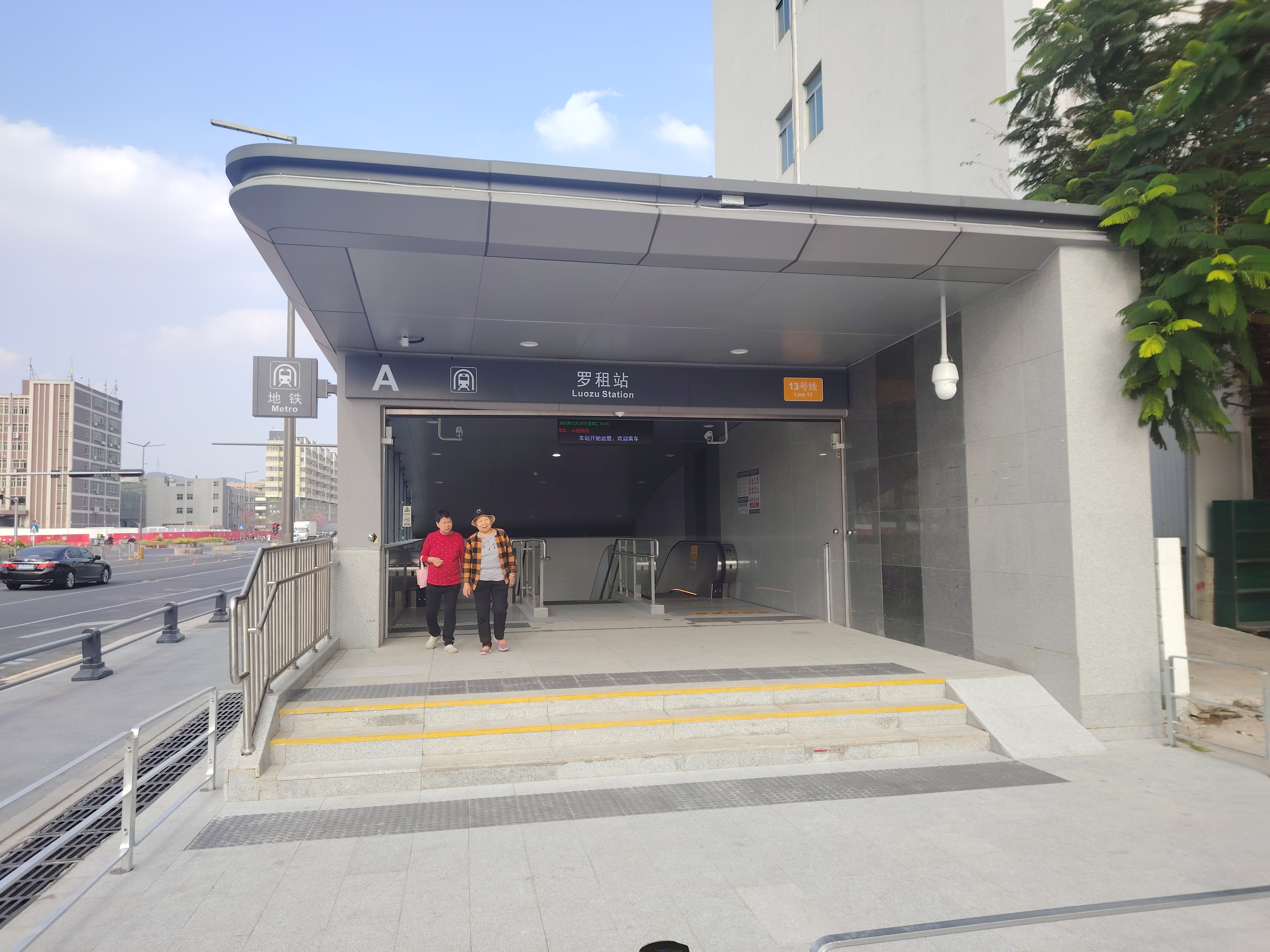
Entrance A

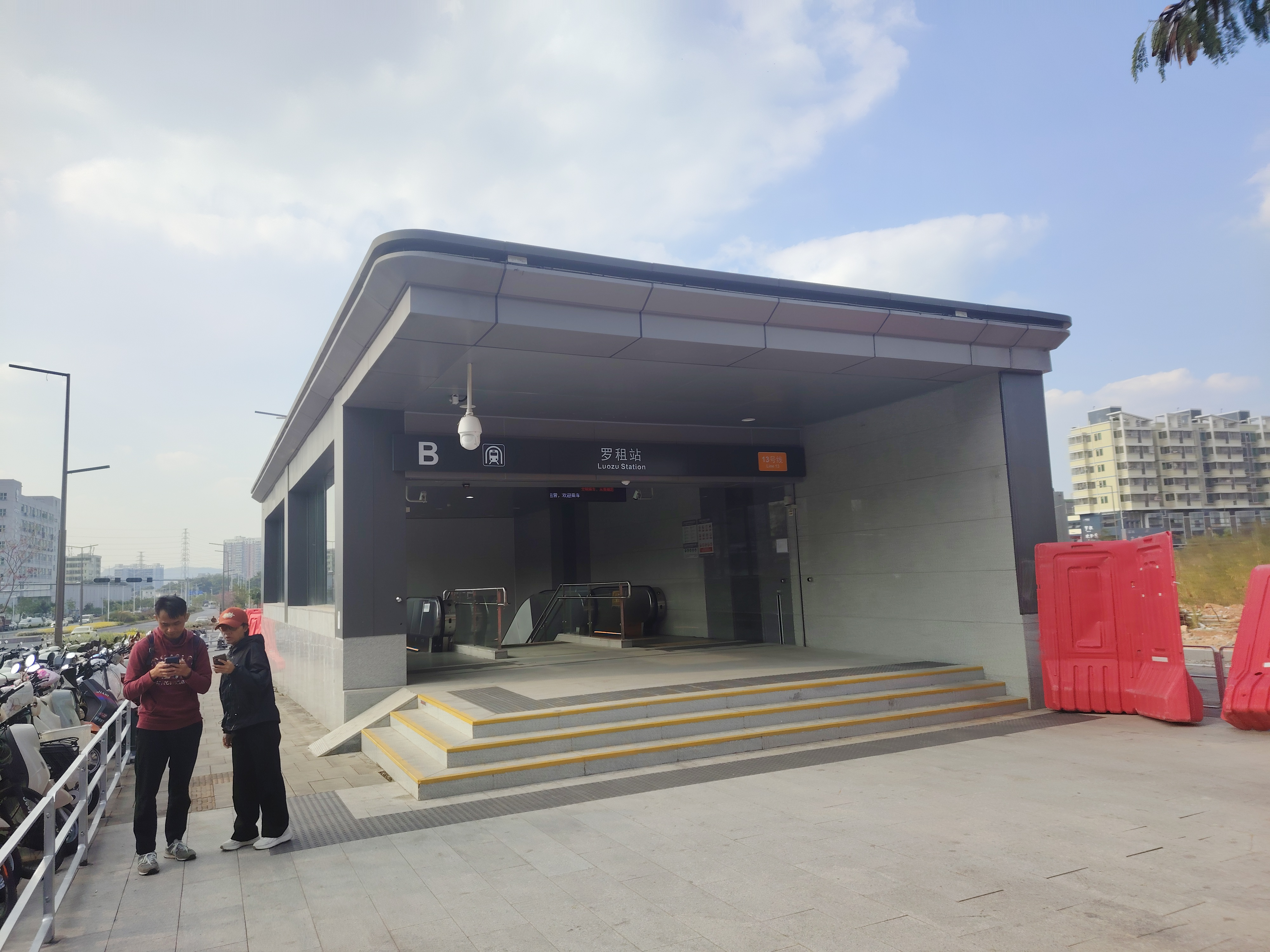
Entrance B

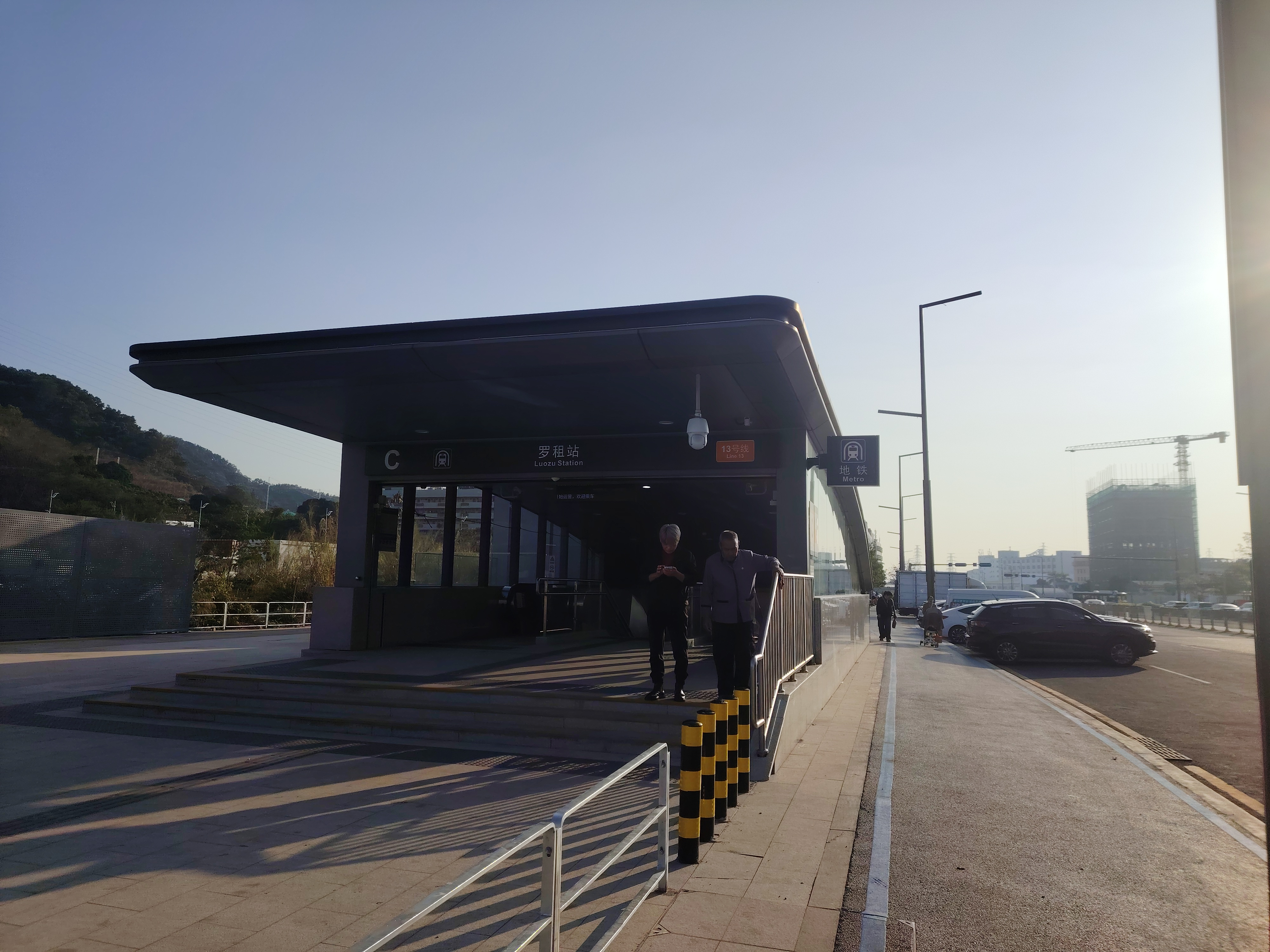
Entrance C

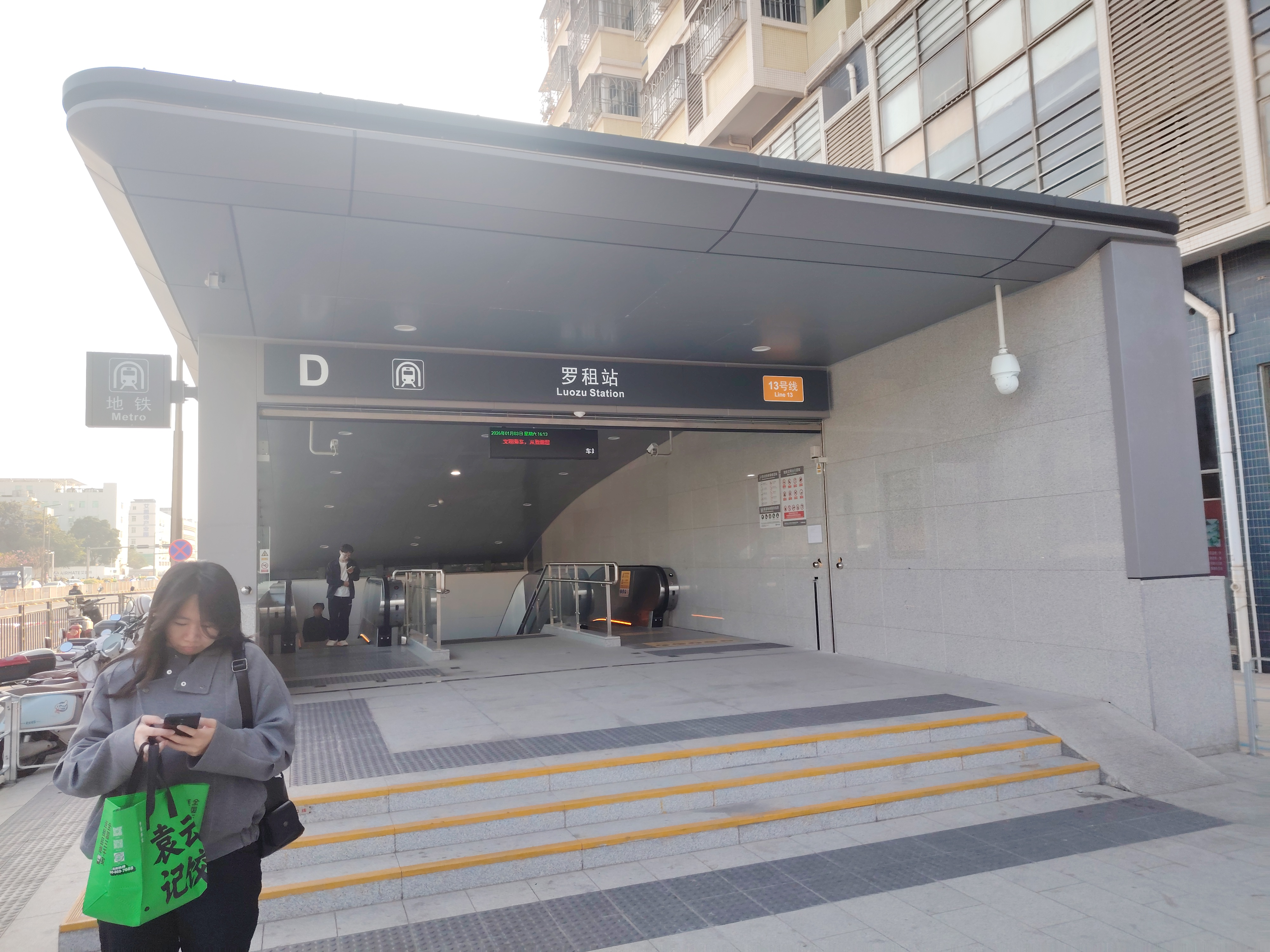
Entrance D

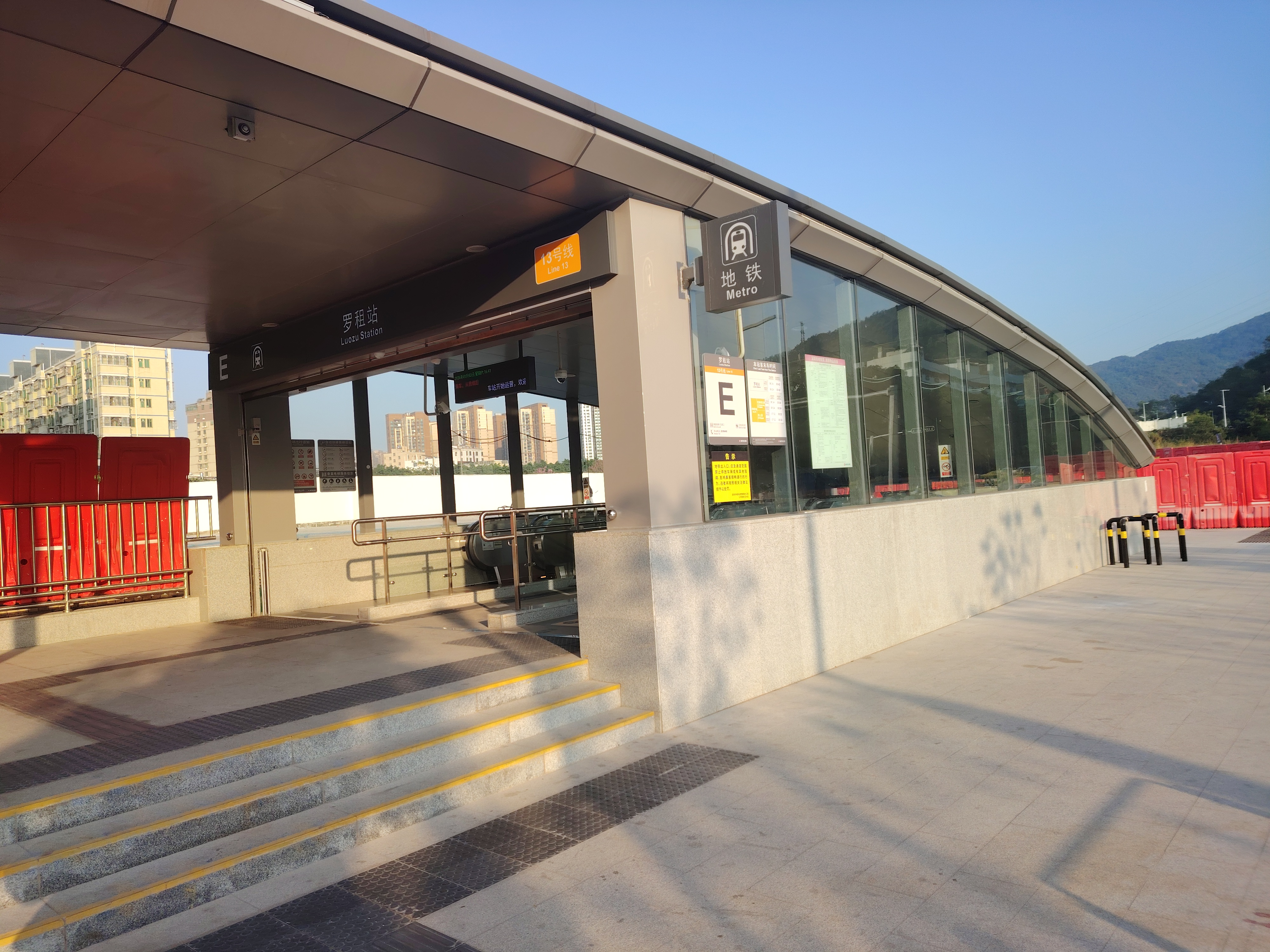
Entrance E

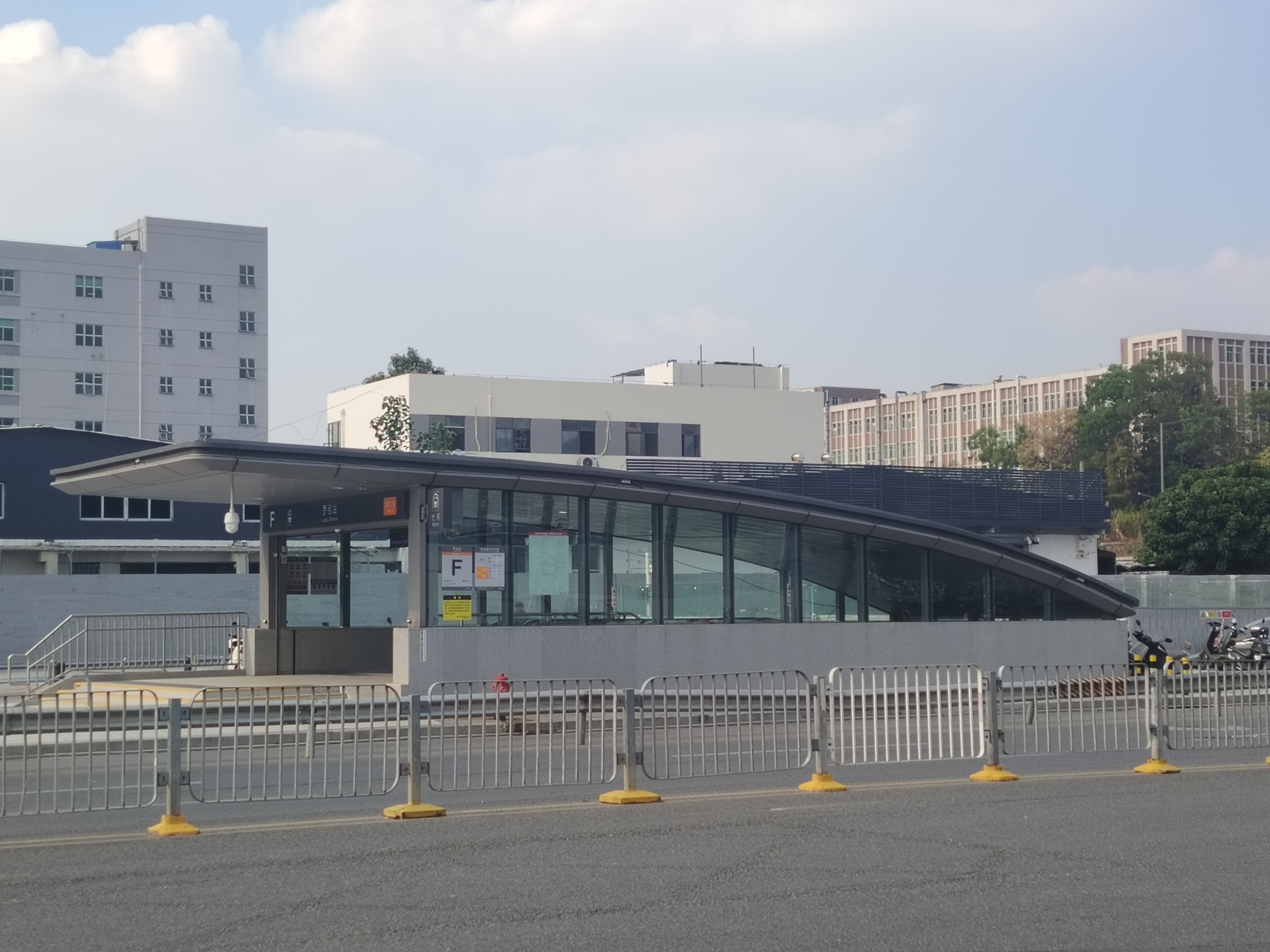
Entrance F

== Construction timeline ==
- On 26 July 2017, Shenzhen Metro Group Co., Ltd. issued the "Environmental Impact Report of Shenzhen Urban Rail Transit Line 13 Project", which includes this station, and the project is named Luozu Station.
- On 23 September 2019, the concrete pouring of the first section of the station structure was successfully completed.
- On 22 April 2022, the Shenzhen Municipal Bureau of Planning and Natural Resources issued the Announcement on the Approval of the Plan for the Station Names of Relevant Lines of the Fourth Phase of Shenzhen Metro, and the station kept the planning name of "Luozu Station".
- On 28 December 2025, the station officially opened along with the new stations of Line 13's Phase 1 North Section (except Xili HSR station).
