= Baiwang station =

Shenzhen Metro Line 13 station

Baiwang 百旺
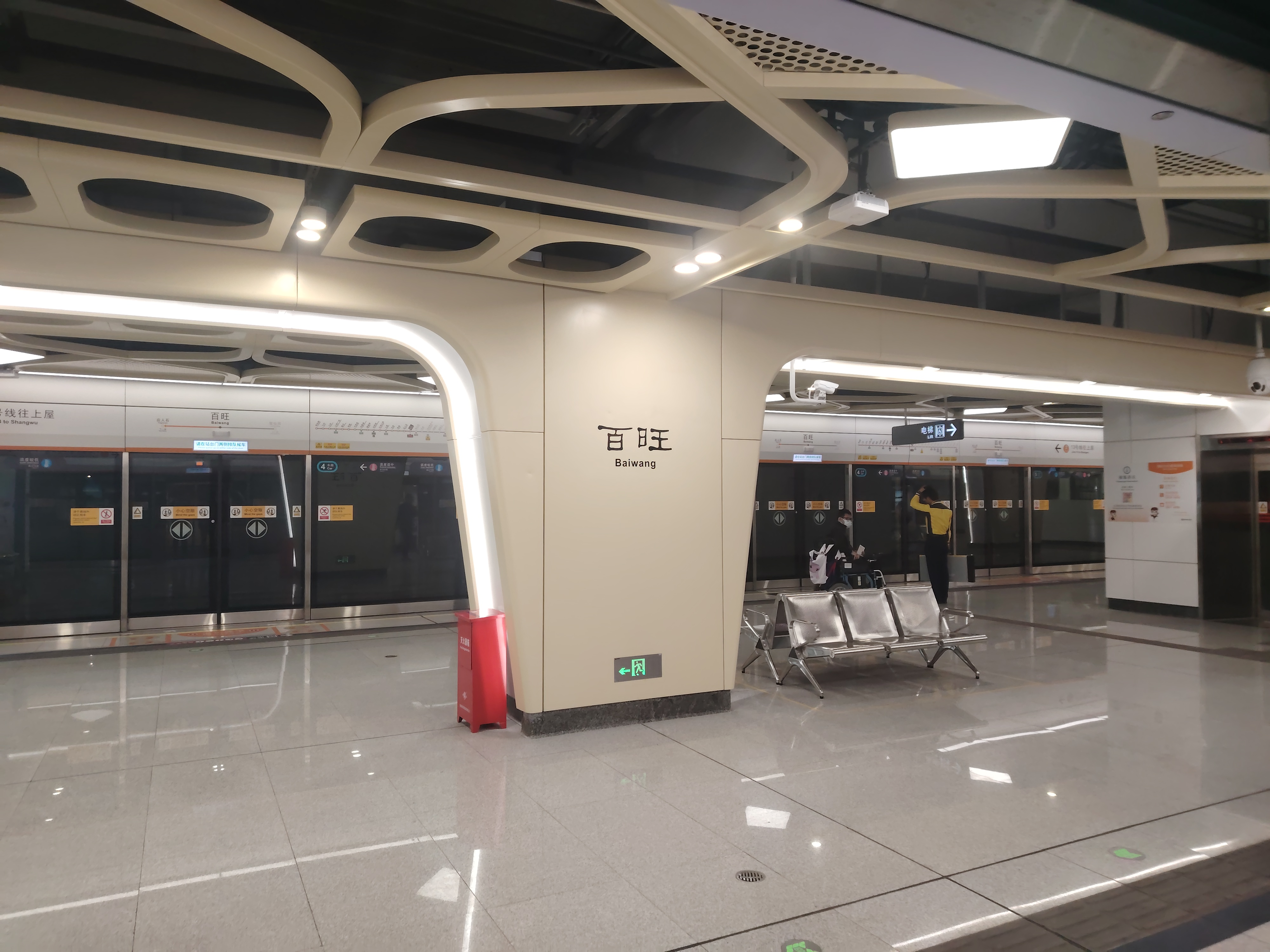
- Platform

Chinese name
- Chinese: 百旺
Transcriptions
Standard Mandarin
- Hanyu Pinyin: Bǎiwàng
Yue: Cantonese
- Yale Romanization: Báahkwohng
- Jyutping: Baak3 Wong6

General information
- Location: West side of intersection of Shahe West Road (沙河西路) and Likang Road (丽康路); Nanshan District, Shenzhen, Guangdong; China
- Coordinates: 22°37′30″N 113°56′3″E
- Operated by: MTR China Railway Electrification Rail Transit (Shenzhen) Co., Ltd (MTR Rail Transit (Shenzhen) Co., Ltd. and China Railway Electrification Bureau Group Co., Ltd.)
- Line: Line 13
- Platforms: 2 (1 island platform)
- Tracks: 2

Construction
- Structure type: Underground
- Accessible: Yes

History
- Opened: 28 December 2025 (6 months ago)
- Previous names: Baimang (白芒), Baiwang·HKU (百旺港大)

Services
Preceding station	Shenzhen Metro	Following station
Liuxiandong towards Shenzhen Bay Checkpoint	Line 13	Yingrenshi towards Lisonglang
Location

Baiwang station (Chinese: 百旺站; pinyin: Bǎiwàng Zhàn; Cantonese Yale: Báahkwohng Jaahm) is a station on Line 13 of Shenzhen Metro. It opened on 28 December 2025, and is located in Nanshan District.

== Station layout ==
G	-	Exits A, B, C, D
B1F; Concourse	Lobby	Ticket Machines, Customer Service, Station Control Room
B2F; Platforms	Platform 1	13 towards Shenzhen Bay Checkpoint (Liuxiandong)
B2F; Platforms	Island platform, doors will open on the left
B2F; Platforms	Platform 2	13 towards Lisonglang (Yingrenshi)

=== Gallery ===
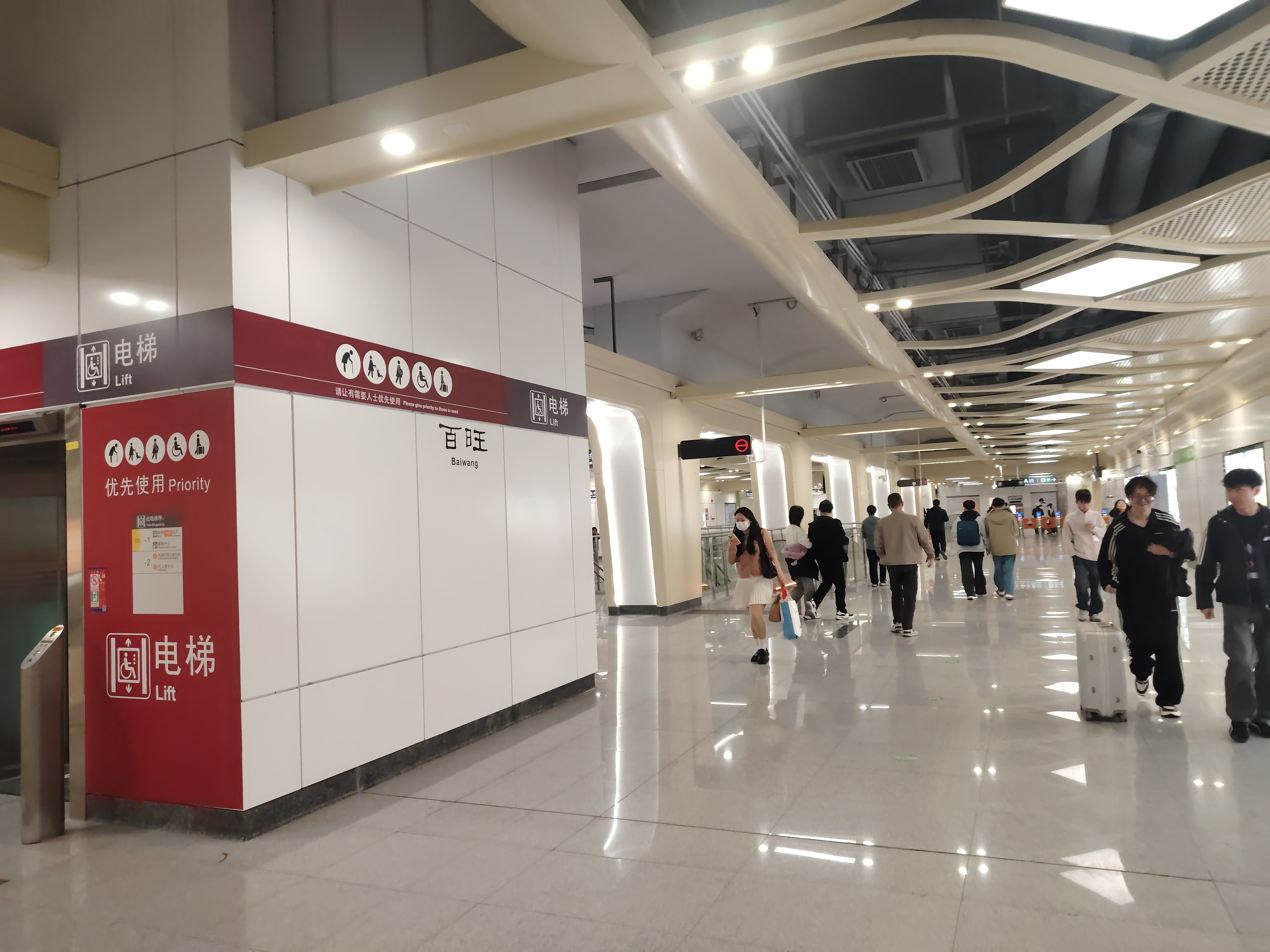
Concourse

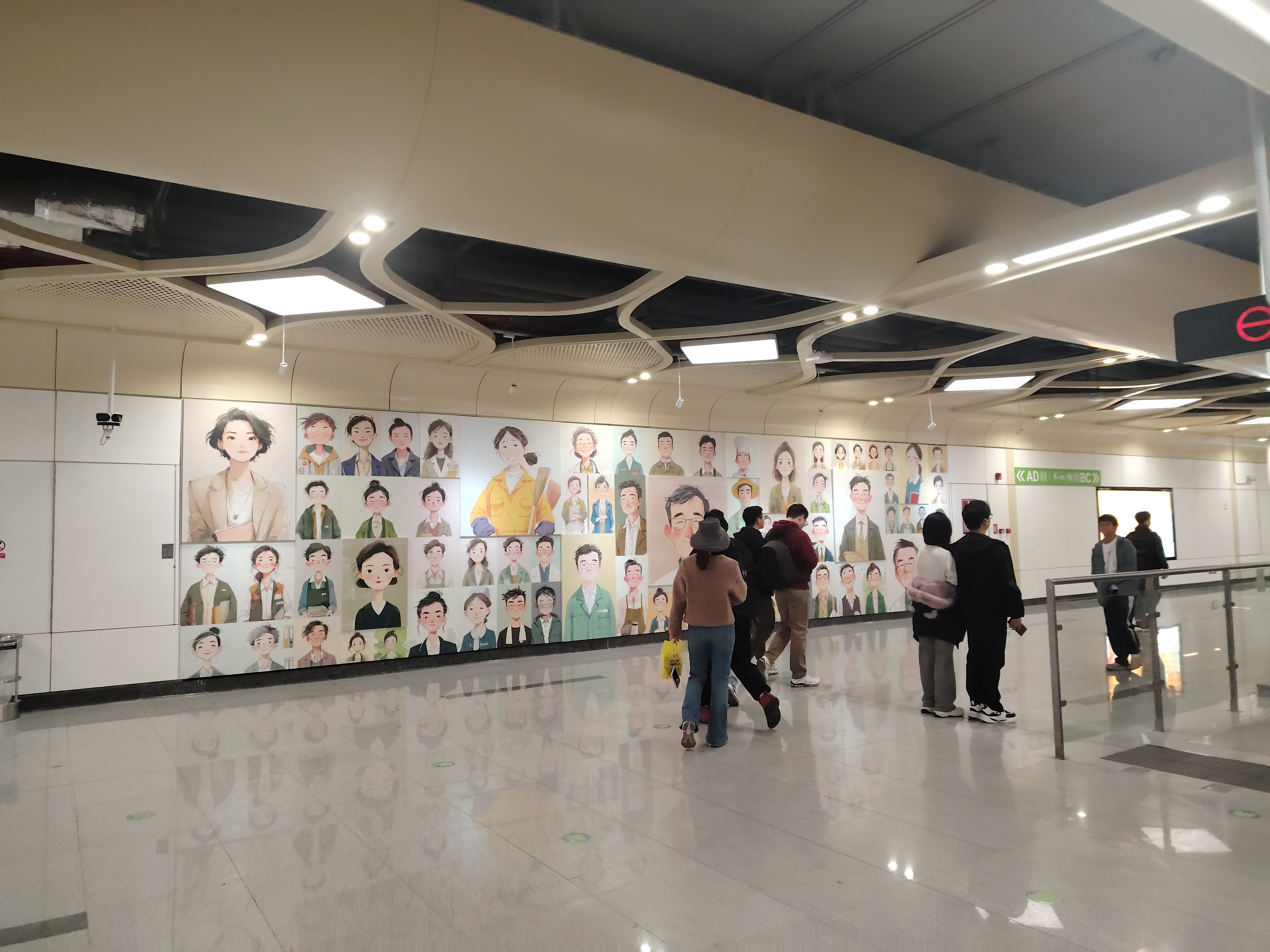
Art wall

=== Entrances/exits ===
The station has 4 points of entry/exit. Exits A and C are equipped with elevators.

- : Shahe West Road (E), Baiwang Community (Baimang Village) Huanxi Lihu Bidao
- : Shahe West Road (E), Baiwang Community (Baimang Village) Baiwangxin Industrial Zone, Baimang Primary School
- : Shahe West Road (W), Likang Road, Renzhi Experimental School, Pengcheng Laboratory Shibilong Campus, Baimang Parking Lot
- : Shahe West Road (W), Huanxi Lihu Bidao
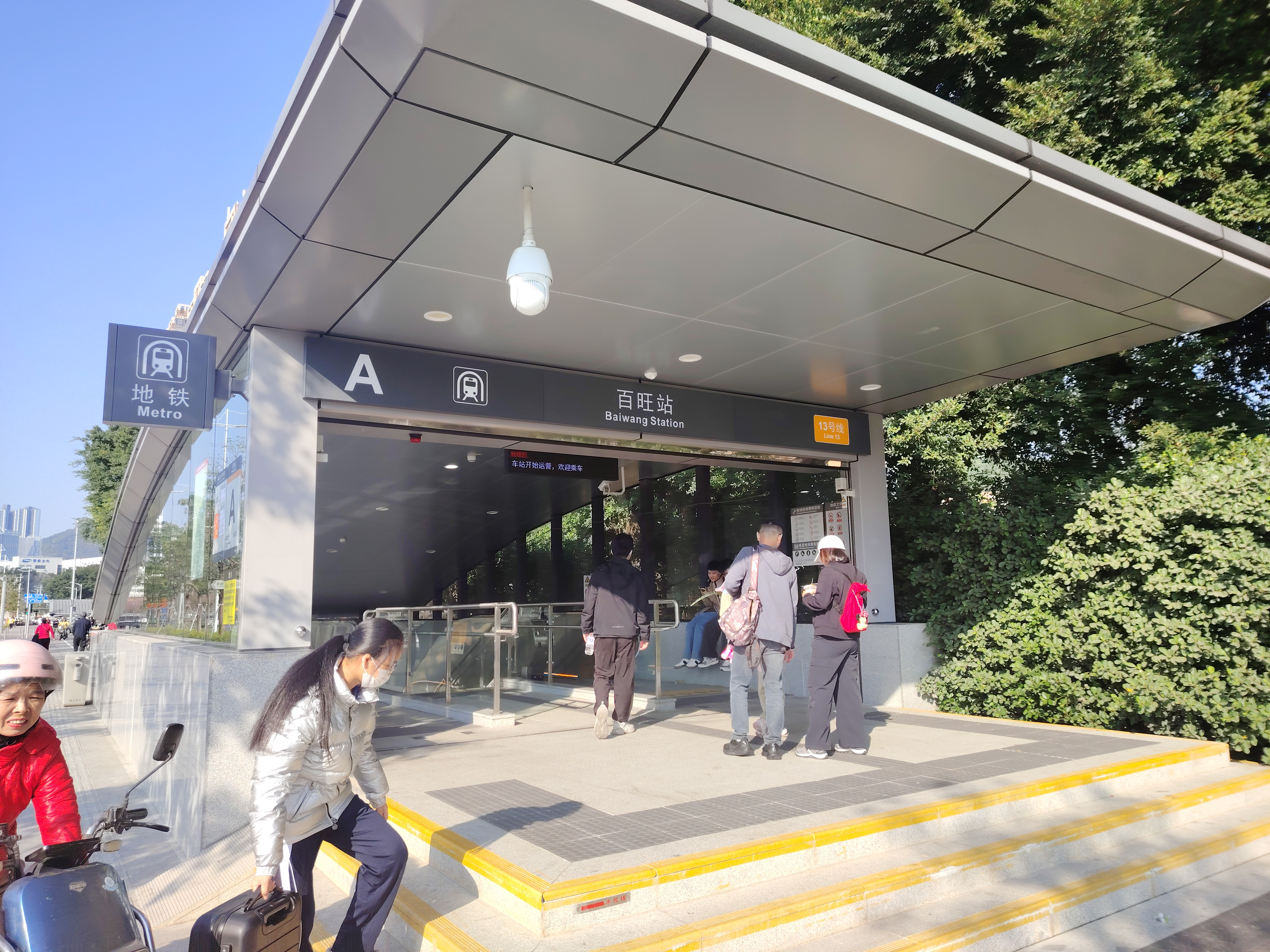
Entrance A

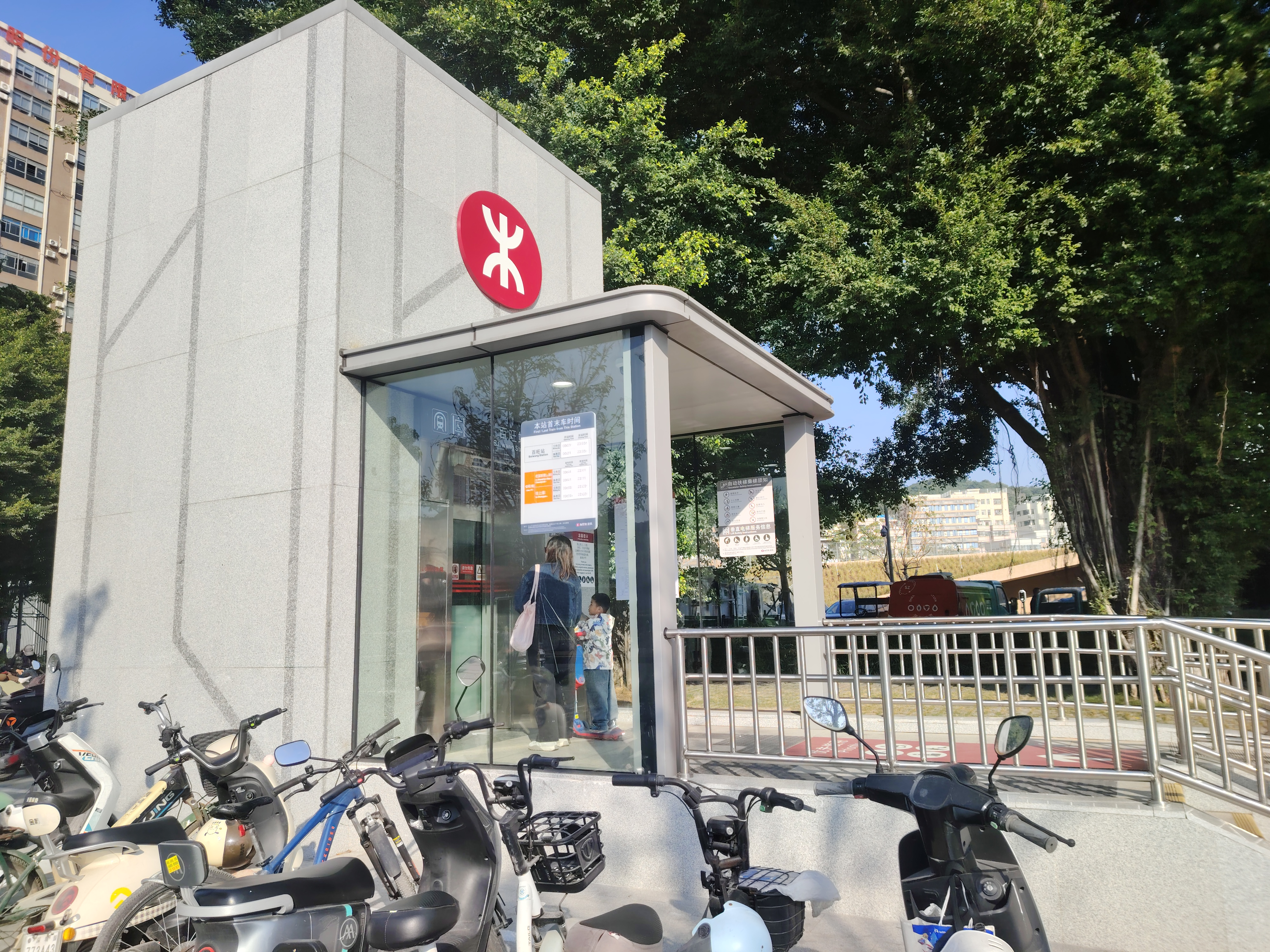
Entrance A (elevator entrance)

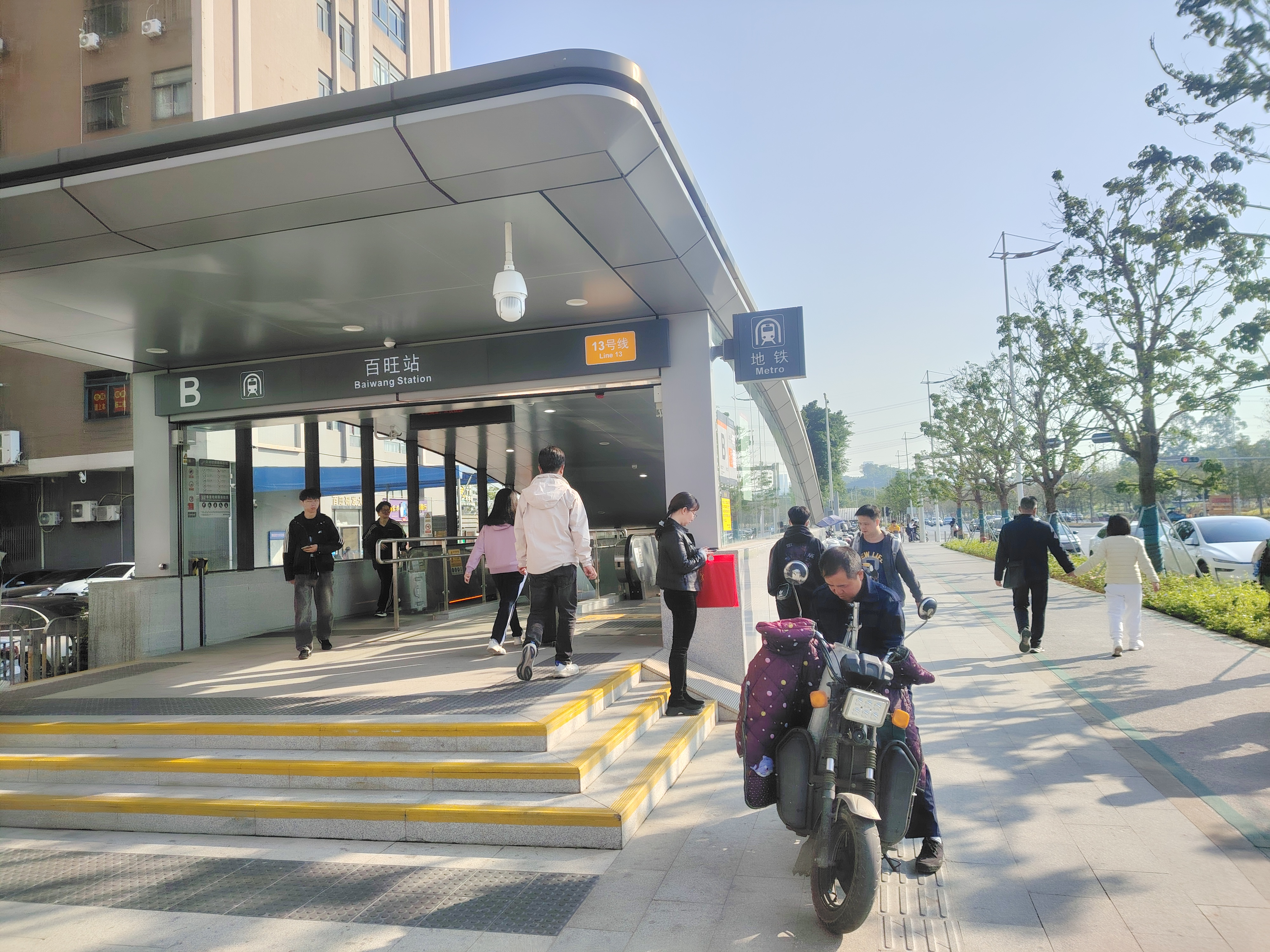
Entrance B

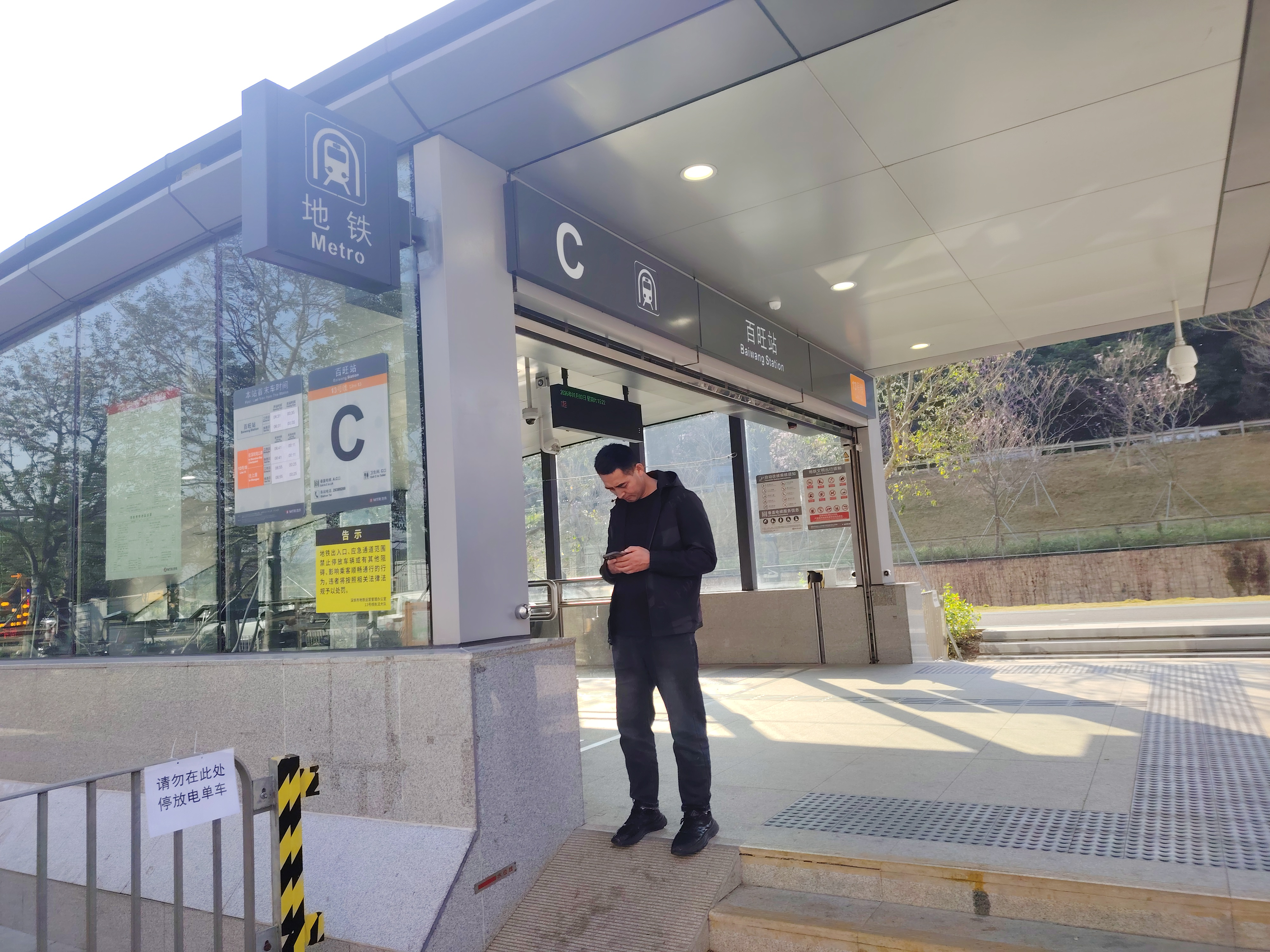
Entrance C

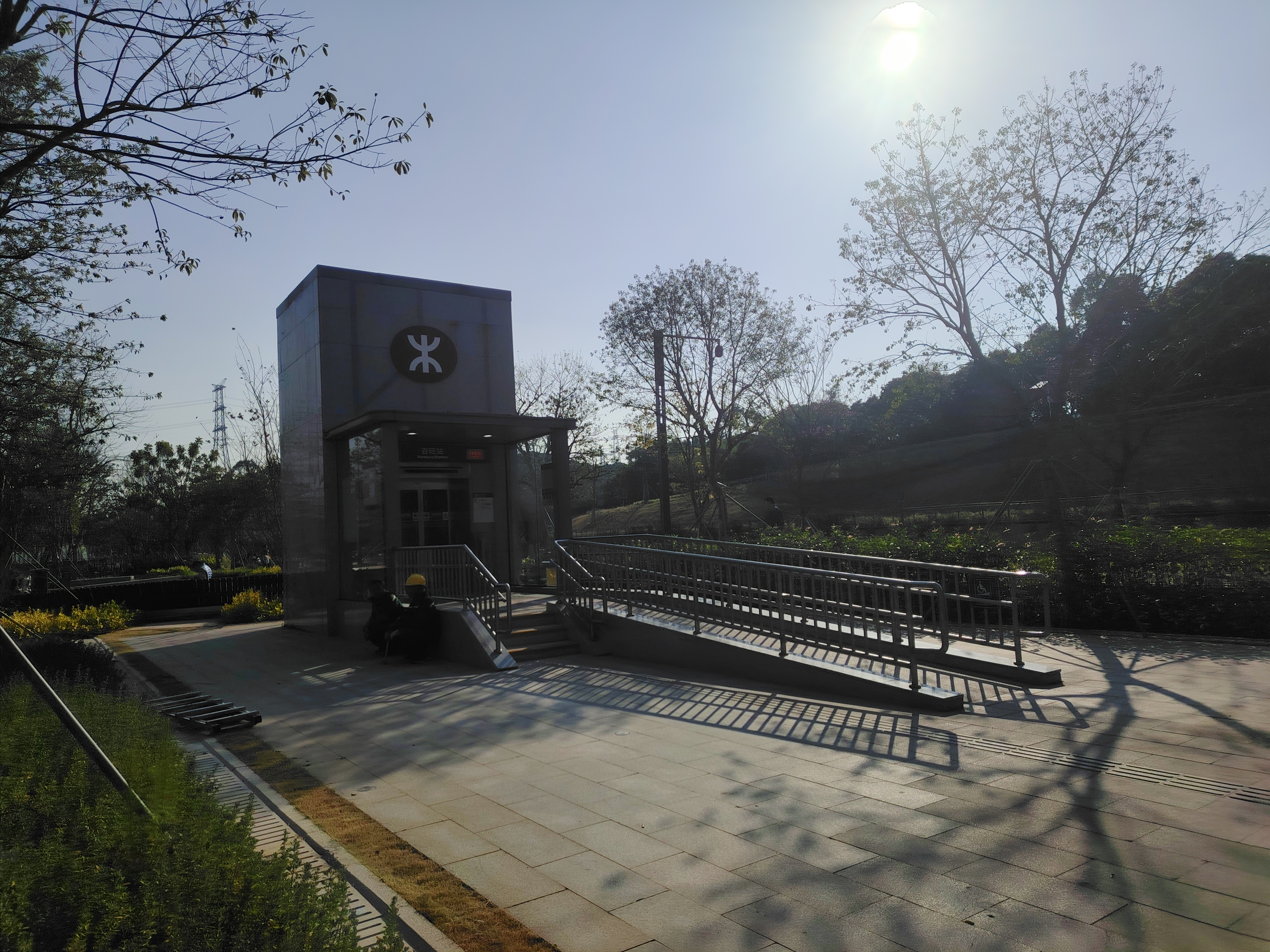
Entrance C (elevator entrance)

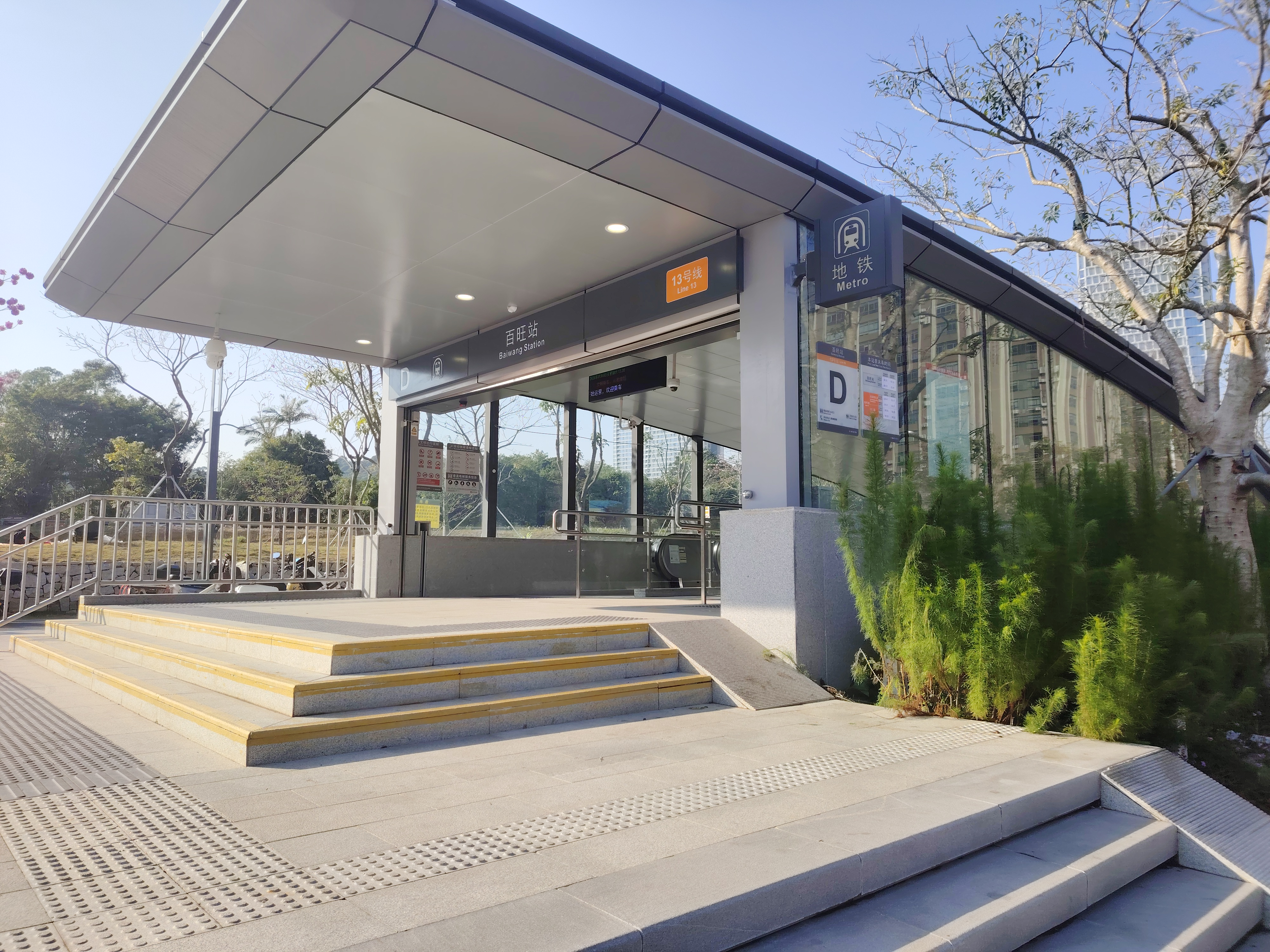
Entrance D

== Construction timeline ==
- On 26 July 2017, Shenzhen Metro Group Co., Ltd. issued the "Environmental Impact Report of Shenzhen Urban Rail Transit Line 13 Project", which includes this station, and the project is named Baimang Station.
- On 29 September 2019, the acceptance of the excavation conditions of the deep foundation pit of the station was successfully passed.
- On 22 April 2022, the Shenzhen Municipal Bureau of Planning and Natural Resources issued the Announcement on the Approval of the Plan for the Station Names of Relevant Lines of the Fourth Phase of Shenzhen Metro, and the station was renamed from "Baimang Station" to the official station name, "Baiwang·HKU Station".
- On 17 December 2025, due to the cancellation of the HKU Shenzhen campus, the Shenzhen Municipal Bureau of Planning and Natural Resources issued a notice on the adjustment of the name of this station, and the station is planned to be renamed from "Baiwang·HKU Station" to "Baiwang Station".
- On 28 December 2025, the station officially opened along with the new stations of Line 13's Phase 1 North Section (except Xili HSR station).
