= Shiyan station =

Shenzhen Metro Line 13 station

Shiyan 石岩
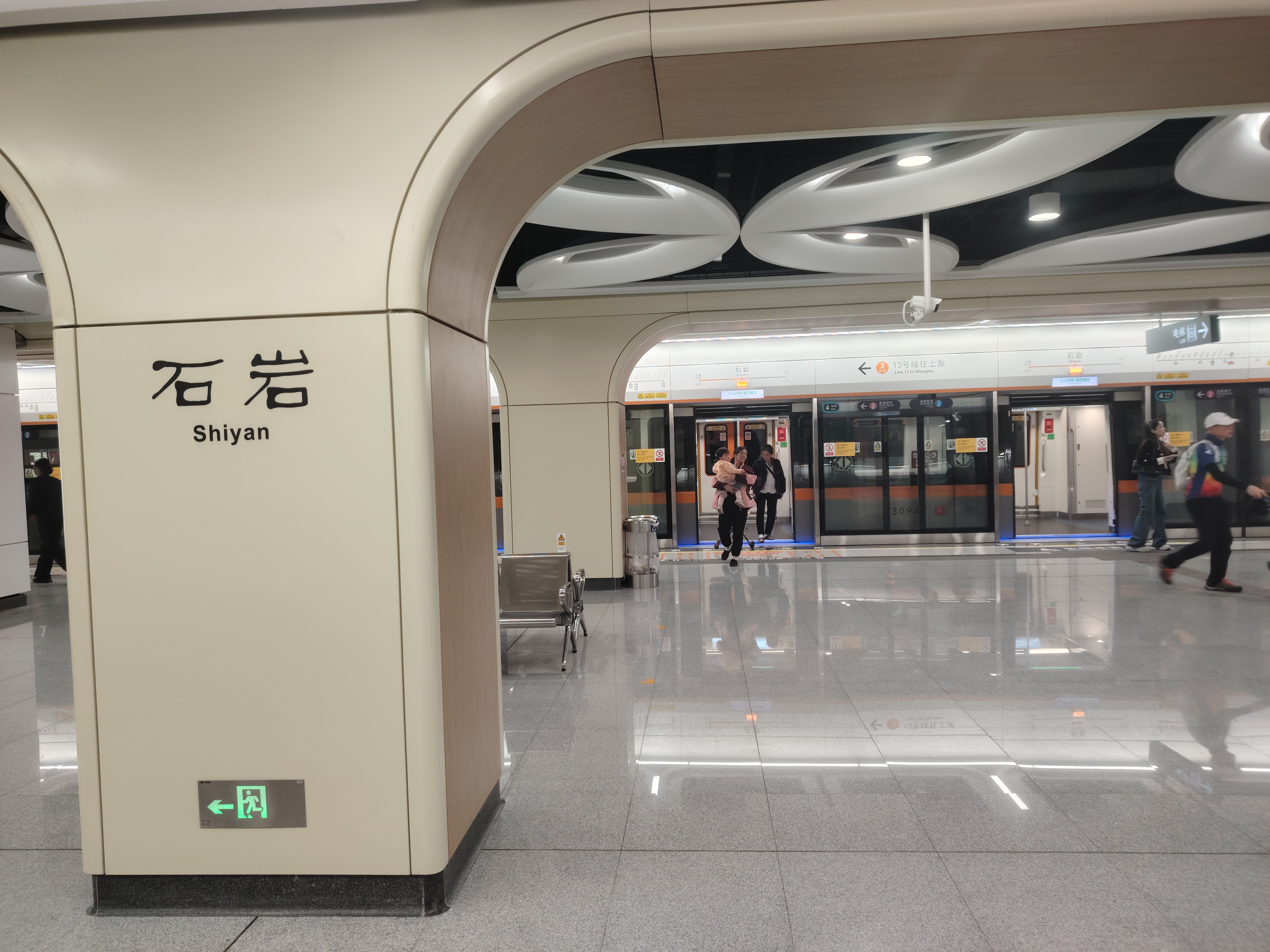
- Platform

Chinese name
- Chinese: 石岩
Transcriptions
Standard Mandarin
- Hanyu Pinyin: Shíyán
Yue: Cantonese
- Yale Romanization: Sehkngǎam
- Jyutping: Sek6 Ngaam4

General information
- Location: Intersection of Shangwu Avenue (上屋大道) and Baoshi East Road (宝石东路); Shiyan Subdistrict, Bao'an District, Shenzhen, Guangdong; China
- Coordinates: 22°41′1.0″N 113°56′0.1″E
- Operated by: MTR China Railway Electrification Rail Transit (Shenzhen) Co., Ltd (MTR Rail Transit (Shenzhen) Co., Ltd. and China Railway Electrification Bureau Group Co., Ltd.)
- Line: Line 13
- Platforms: 2 (1 island platform)
- Tracks: 2

Construction
- Structure type: Underground
- Accessible: Yes

History
- Opened: 28 December 2025 (6 months ago)

Services
Preceding station	Shenzhen Metro	Following station
Luozu towards Shenzhen Bay Checkpoint	Line 13	Shangwu towards Lisonglang
Location

Shiyan station (Chinese: 石岩站; pinyin: Shíyán Zhàn; Cantonese Yale: Sehkngǎam Jaahm) is a station on Line 13 of Shenzhen Metro. It opened on 28 December 2025, and is located in Shiyan Subdistrict in Bao'an District.

== Station layout ==
G	-	Exits A-D
B1F; Concourse	Lobby	Ticket Machines, Customer Service, Station Control Room
B2F; Platforms	Platform 1	13 towards Shenzhen Bay Checkpoint (Luozu)
B2F; Platforms	Island platform, doors will open on the left
B2F; Platforms	Platform 2	13 towards Lisonglang (Shangwu)

=== Gallery ===
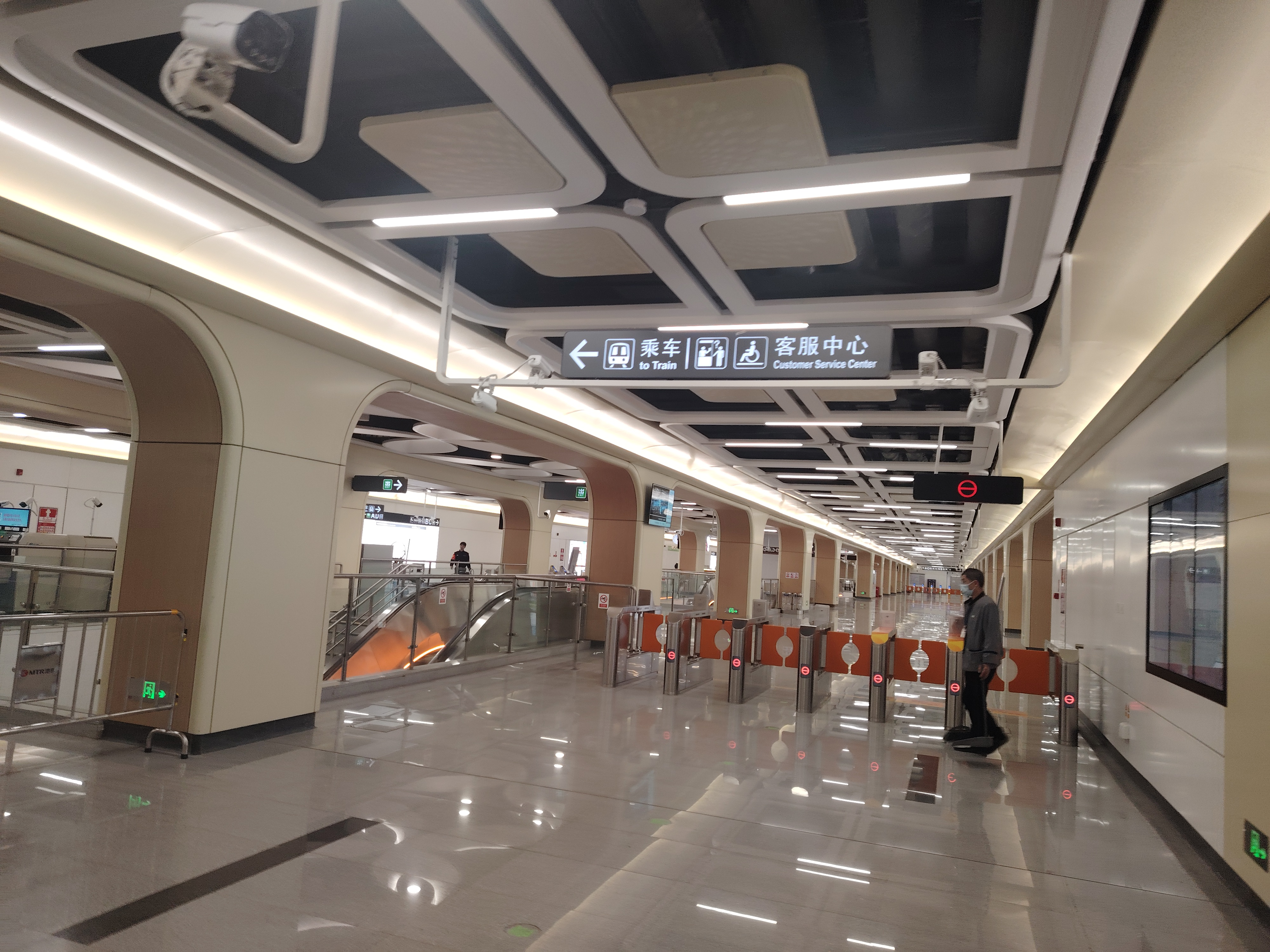
Concourse

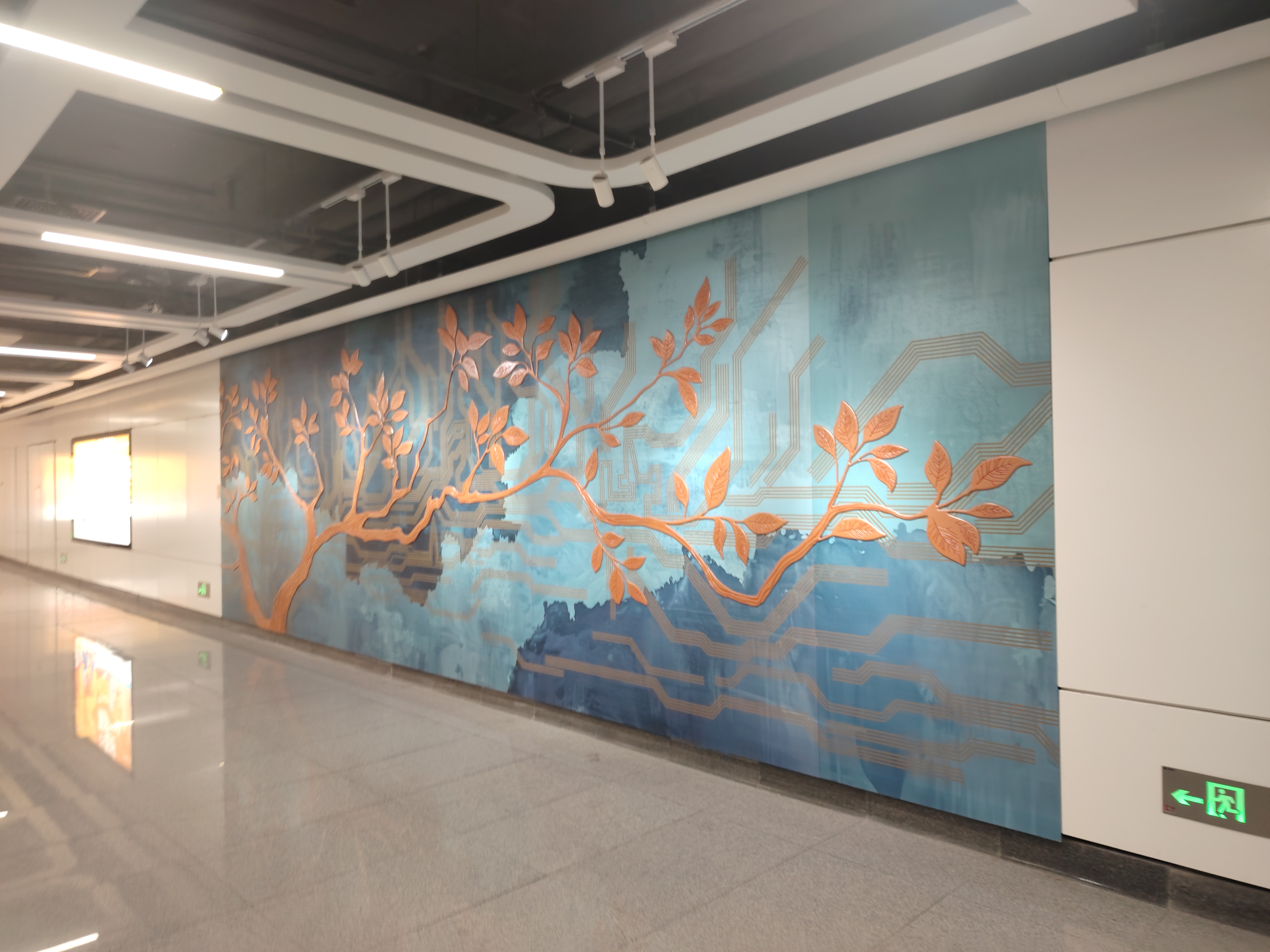
Art wall ("Symbiosis of Copper Veins")

=== Entrances/exits ===
The station has 4 points of entry/exit. Exits A and C are equipped with elevators.

- : Ruyi Road, Baoshi East Road, Shiyan Avenue, Shiyan Hall, Bao'an District Second People's Hospital (Shiyan People's Hospital), Guantian Village, Regal Garden, Jiayang Neighbor
- : Tianxin Avenue, Baoshi East Road, Shiyan Sub-district Office, Guantian Village
- : Tianxin Avenue, Baoshi East Road, Shangwu Village, Shenzhen (Bao'an) Labor Museum
- : Ruyi Road, Baoshi East Road, Baoshi West Road, Shangwu New Estate, Shiyan Police Station, Ruyi Mansion
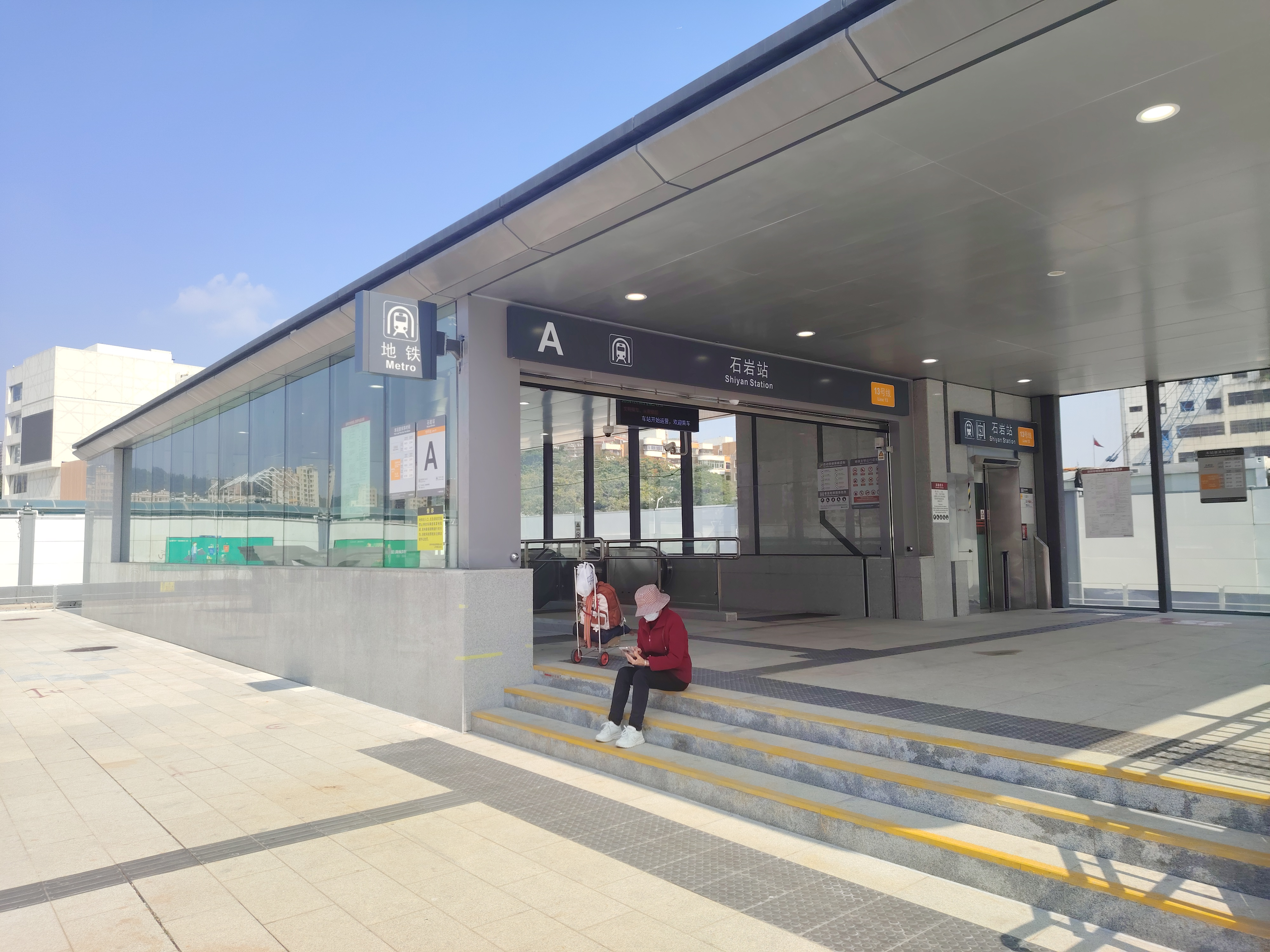
Entrance A

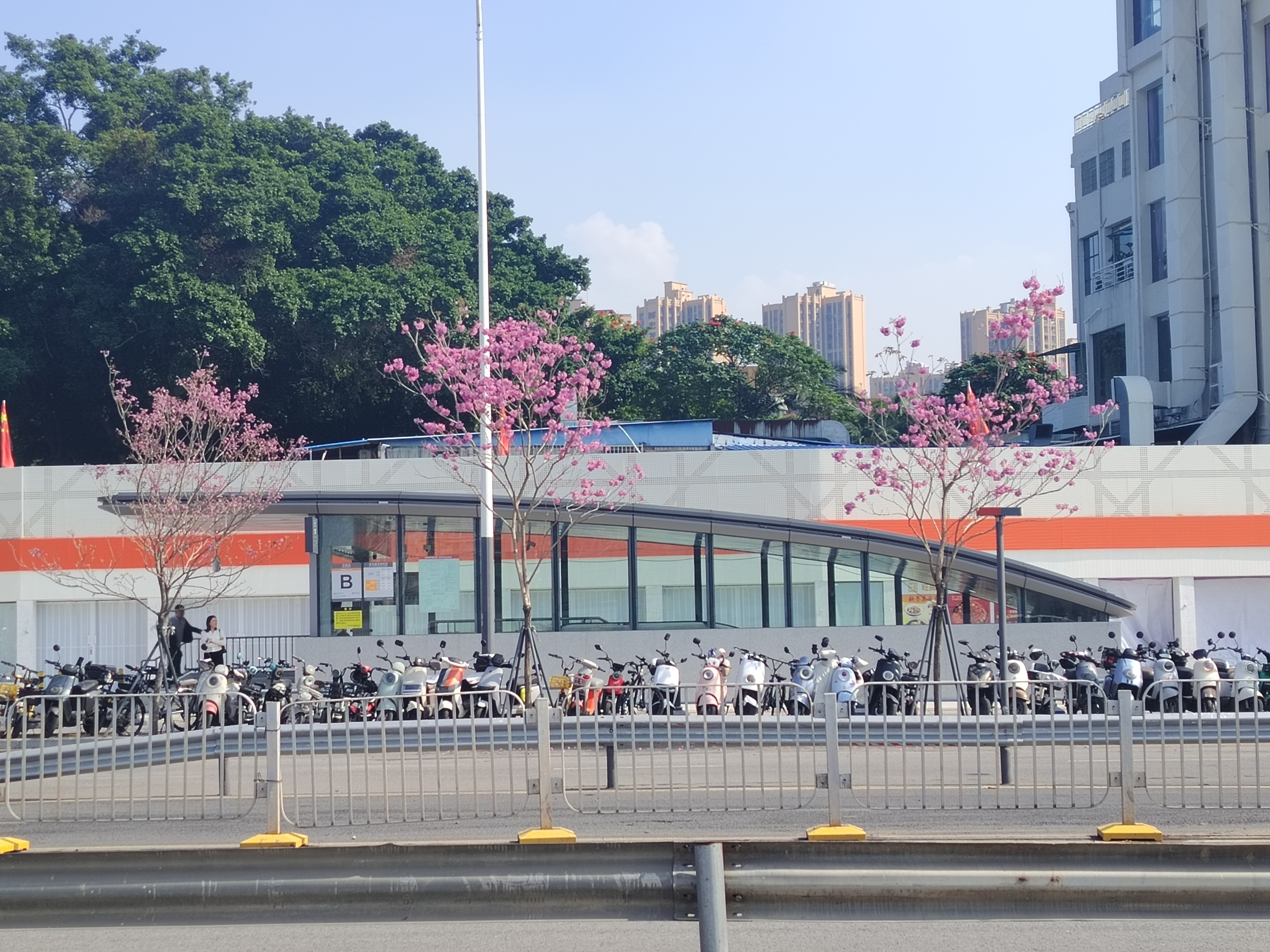
Entrance B

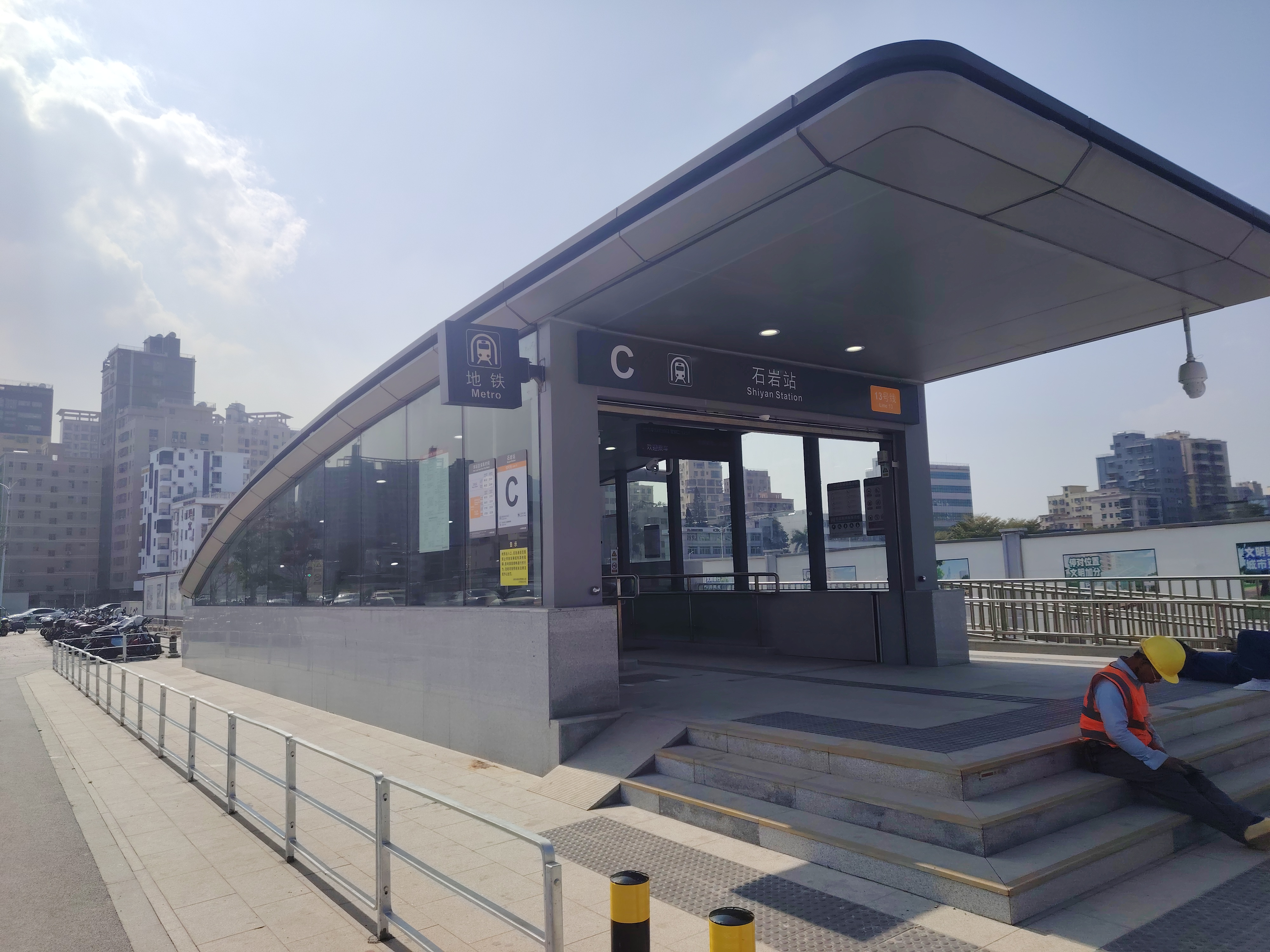
Entrance C

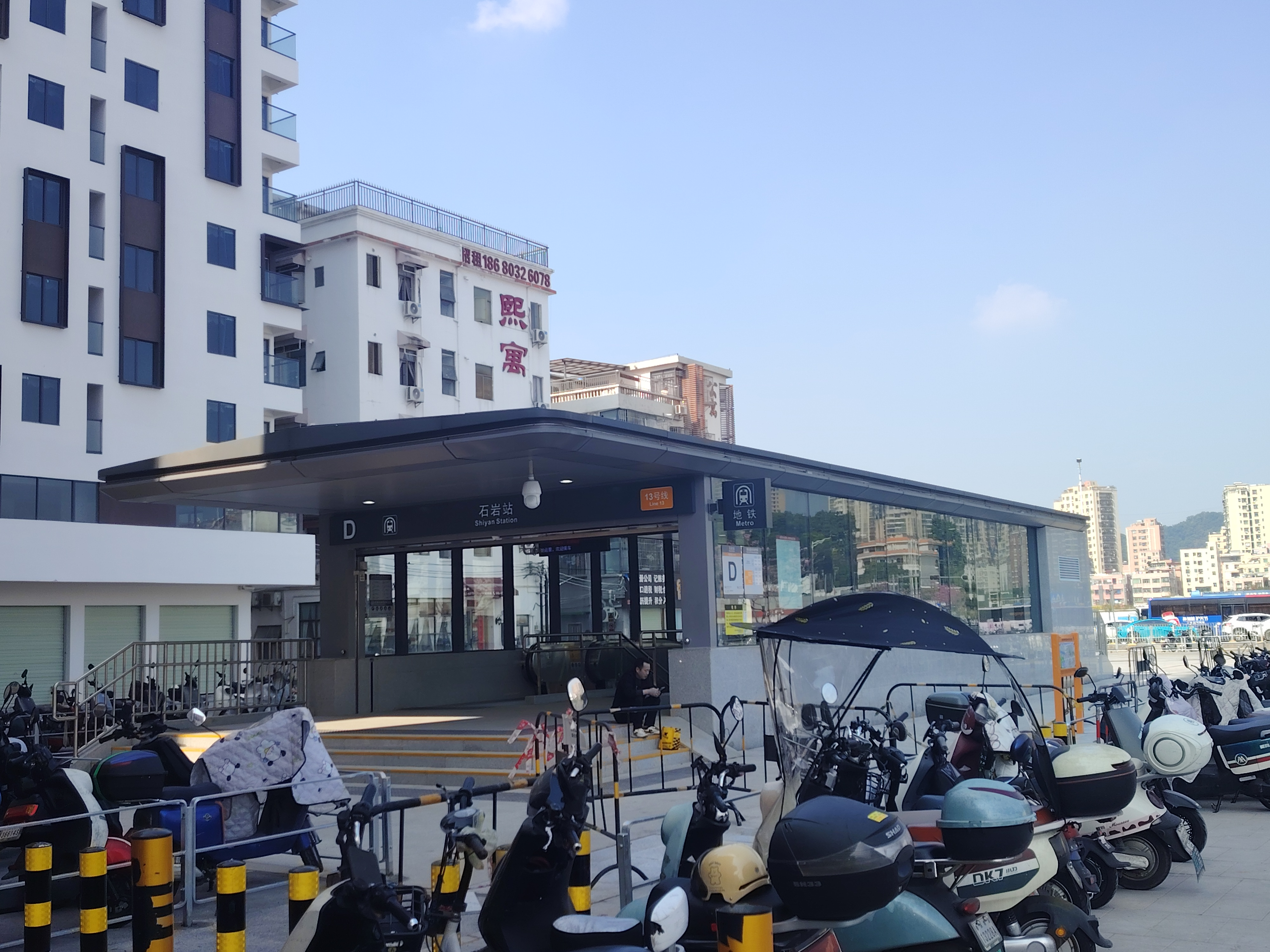
Entrance D

== Construction timeline ==
- On 26 July 2017, Shenzhen Metro Group Co., Ltd. issued the "Environmental Impact Report of Shenzhen Urban Rail Transit Line 13 Project", which includes this station, and the project is named Shiyan Station.
- On 22 April 2022, the Shenzhen Municipal Bureau of Planning and Natural Resources issued the Announcement on the Approval of the Plan for the Station Names of Relevant Lines of the Fourth Phase of Shenzhen Metro, and the station kept the planning name of "Shiyan Station".
- On 28 December 2025, the station officially opened along with the new stations of Line 13's Phase 1 North Section (except Xili HSR station).
