= Yingrenshi station =

Shenzhen Metro Line 13 station

Yingrenshi 应人石
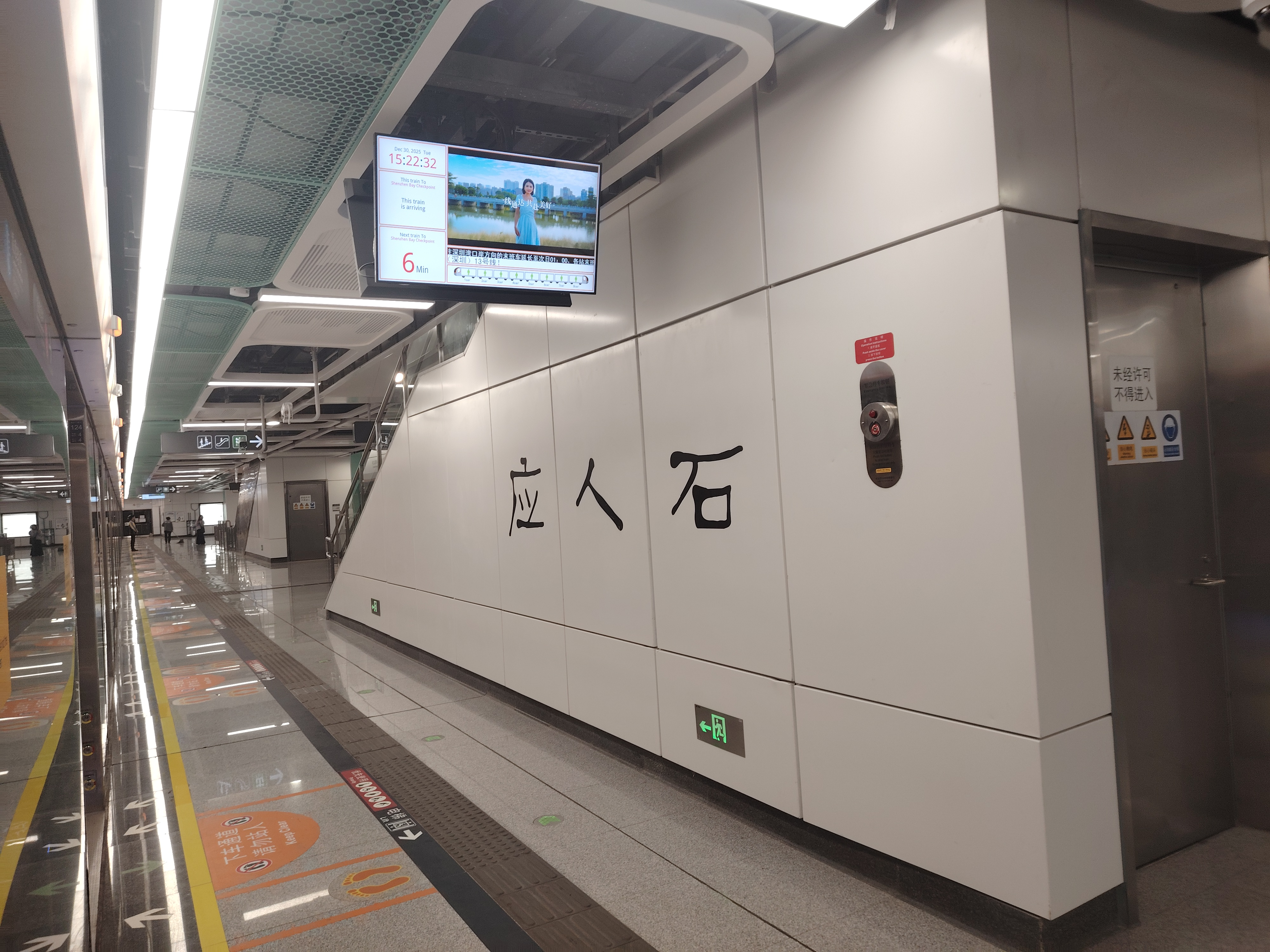
- Platform

Chinese name
- Simplified Chinese: 应人石
- Traditional Chinese: 應人石
Transcriptions
Standard Mandarin
- Hanyu Pinyin: Yīngrénshí
Yue: Cantonese
- Yale Romanization: Yīhngyàhnsehk
- Jyutping: Jing3 Jan4 Sek6

General information
- Location: Intersection of Shichang Road (市场路) and Tianbao Road (天宝路); Shiyan Subdistrict, Bao'an District, Shenzhen, Guangdong; China
- Coordinates: 22°38′49″N 113°55′17″E
- Operated by: MTR China Railway Electrification Rail Transit (Shenzhen) Co., Ltd (MTR Rail Transit (Shenzhen) Co., Ltd. and China Railway Electrification Bureau Group Co., Ltd.)
- Line: Line 13
- Platforms: 2 (1 island platform)
- Tracks: 2

Construction
- Structure type: Underground
- Accessible: Yes

History
- Opened: 28 December 2025 (6 months ago)

Services
Preceding station	Shenzhen Metro	Following station
Baiwang towards Shenzhen Bay Checkpoint	Line 13	Luozu towards Lisonglang
Location

Yingrenshi station (Chinese: 应人石站; pinyin: Yīngrénshí Zhàn; Cantonese Yale: Yīhngyàhnsehk Jaahm) is a station on Line 13 of Shenzhen Metro. It opened on 28 December 2025, and is located in Shiyan Subdistrict in Bao'an District.

== Station layout ==
G	-	Exits A, C, D
B1F; Concourse	Lobby	Ticket Machines, Customer Service, Station Control Room
B2F; Platforms	Platform 1	13 towards Shenzhen Bay Checkpoint (Baiwang·HKU)
B2F; Platforms	Island platform, doors will open on the left
B2F; Platforms	Platform 2	13 towards Lisonglang (Luozu)

=== Gallery ===
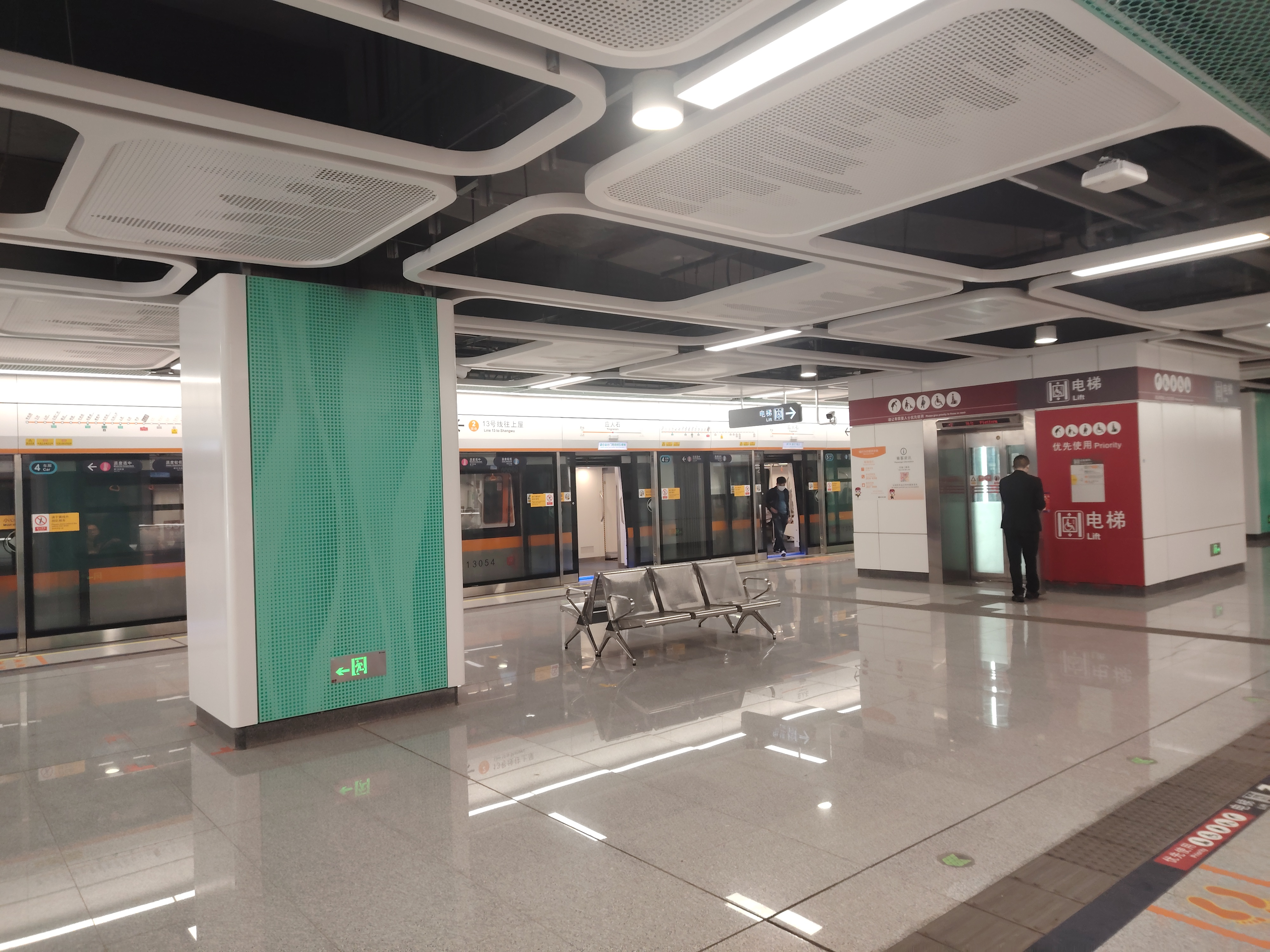
Platform

=== Entrances/exits ===
The station has 3 points of entry/exit. Exits B and C are equipped with elevators.

- : Tianbao Road, Shijing Garden, Yingrenshi New Estate, Wentao Science and Technology Park
- : Tianbao Road, Yingrenshi Road, Fujing New Estate, Yingrenshi Park, Yucai School
- : Baoshi Road, Yingrenshi Market, Yingrenshi Community Health Center, Skyworth Innovation Valley
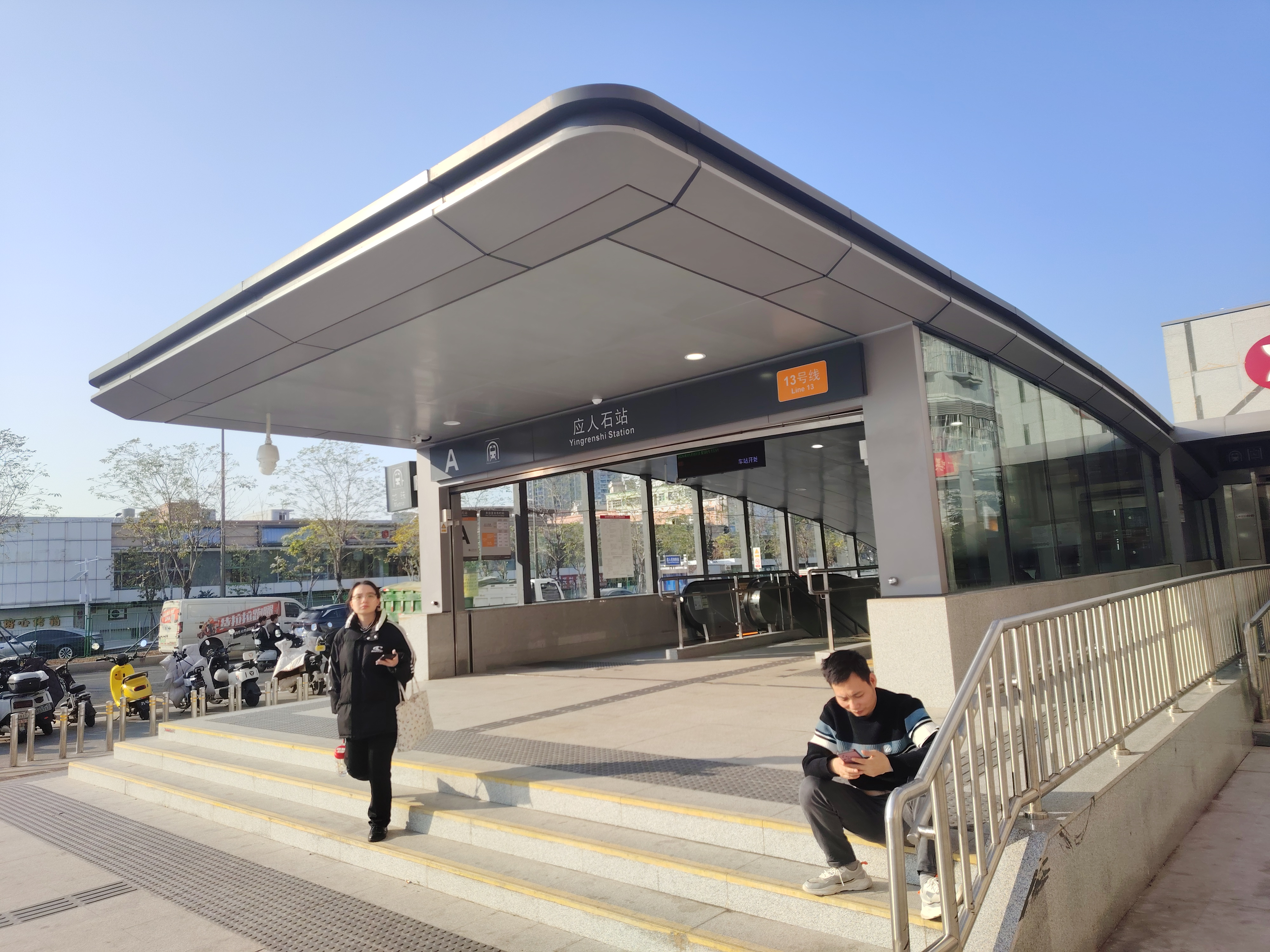
Entrance A

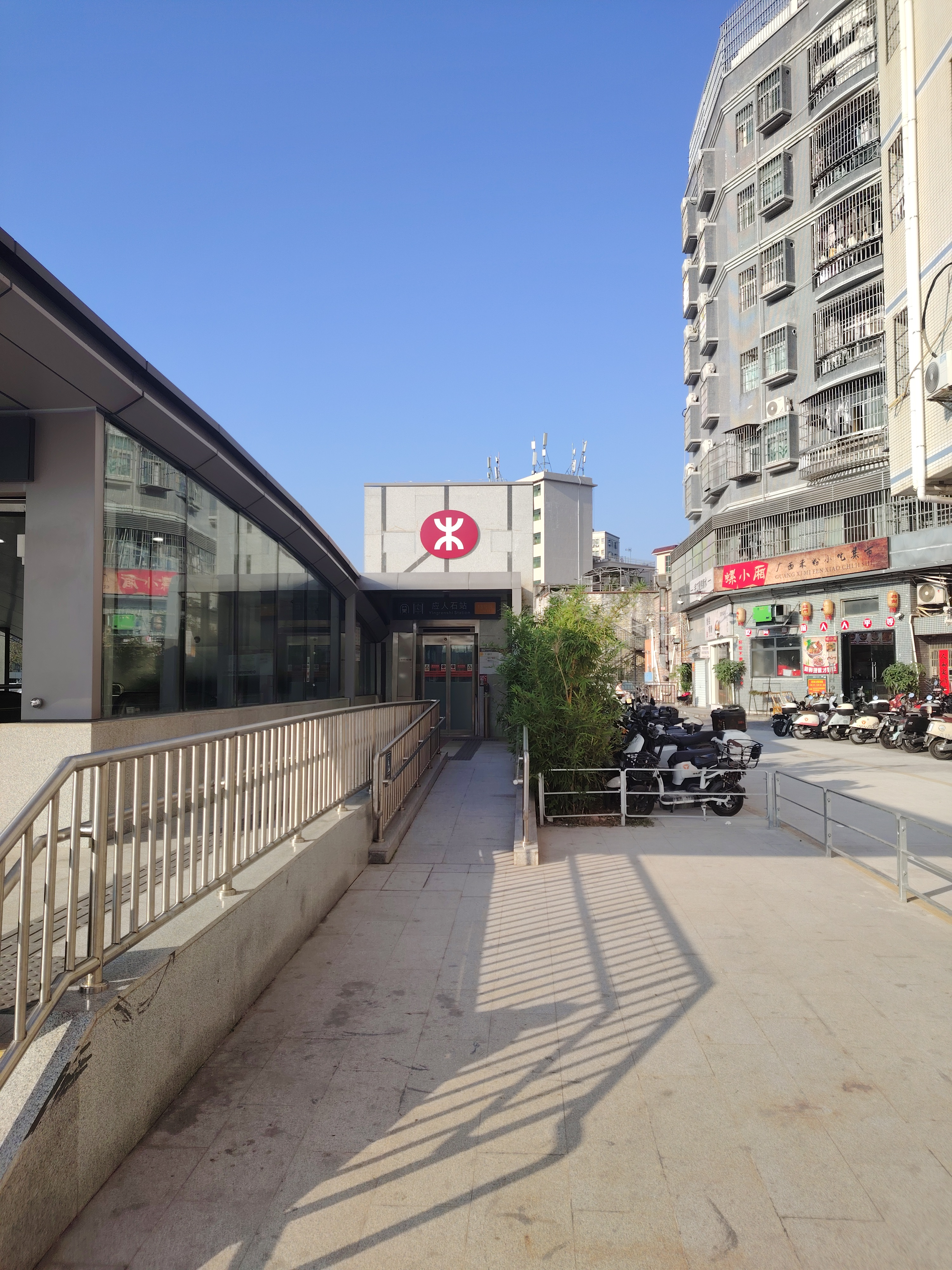
Entrance A (elevator entrance)

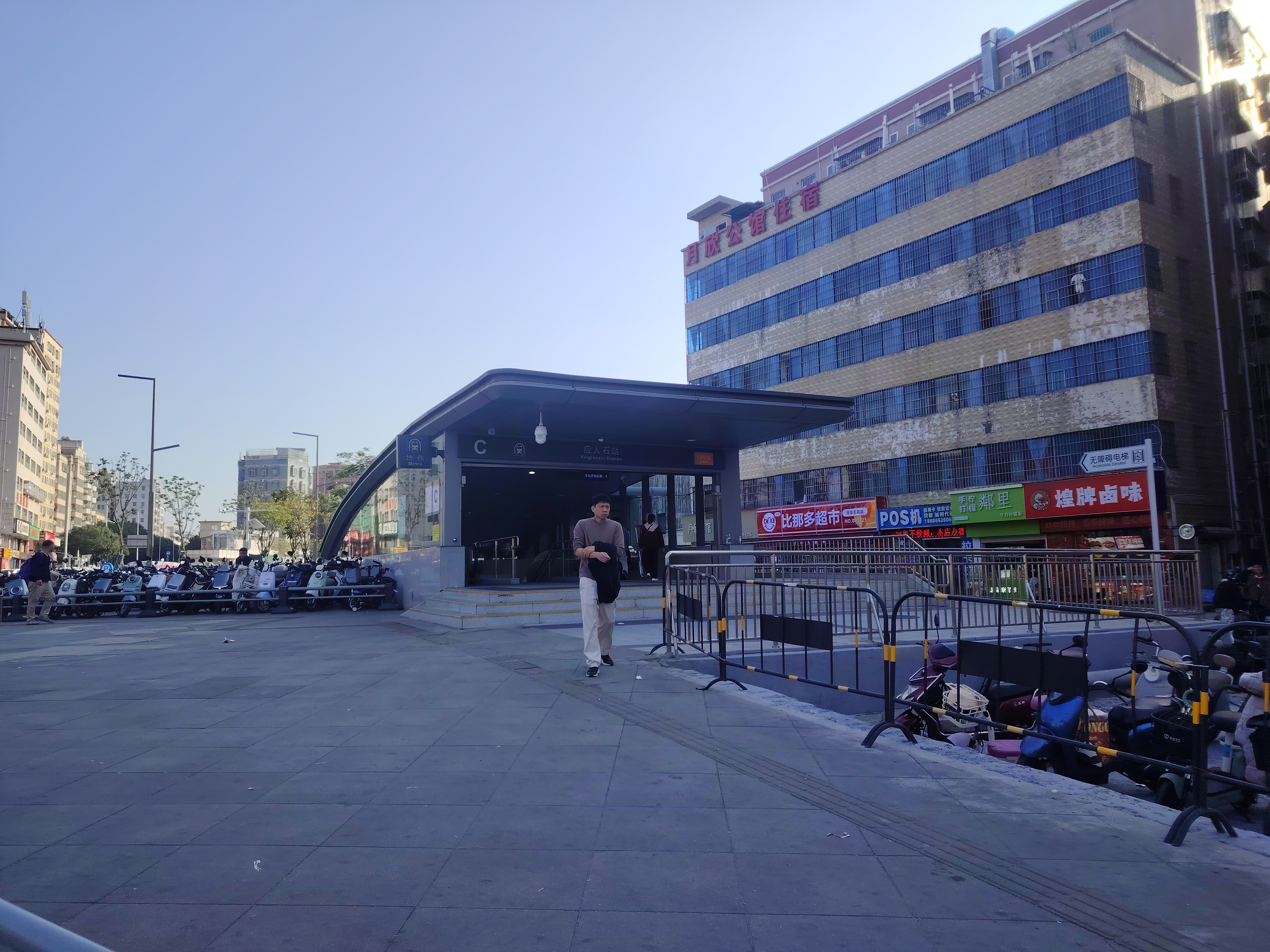
Entrance C

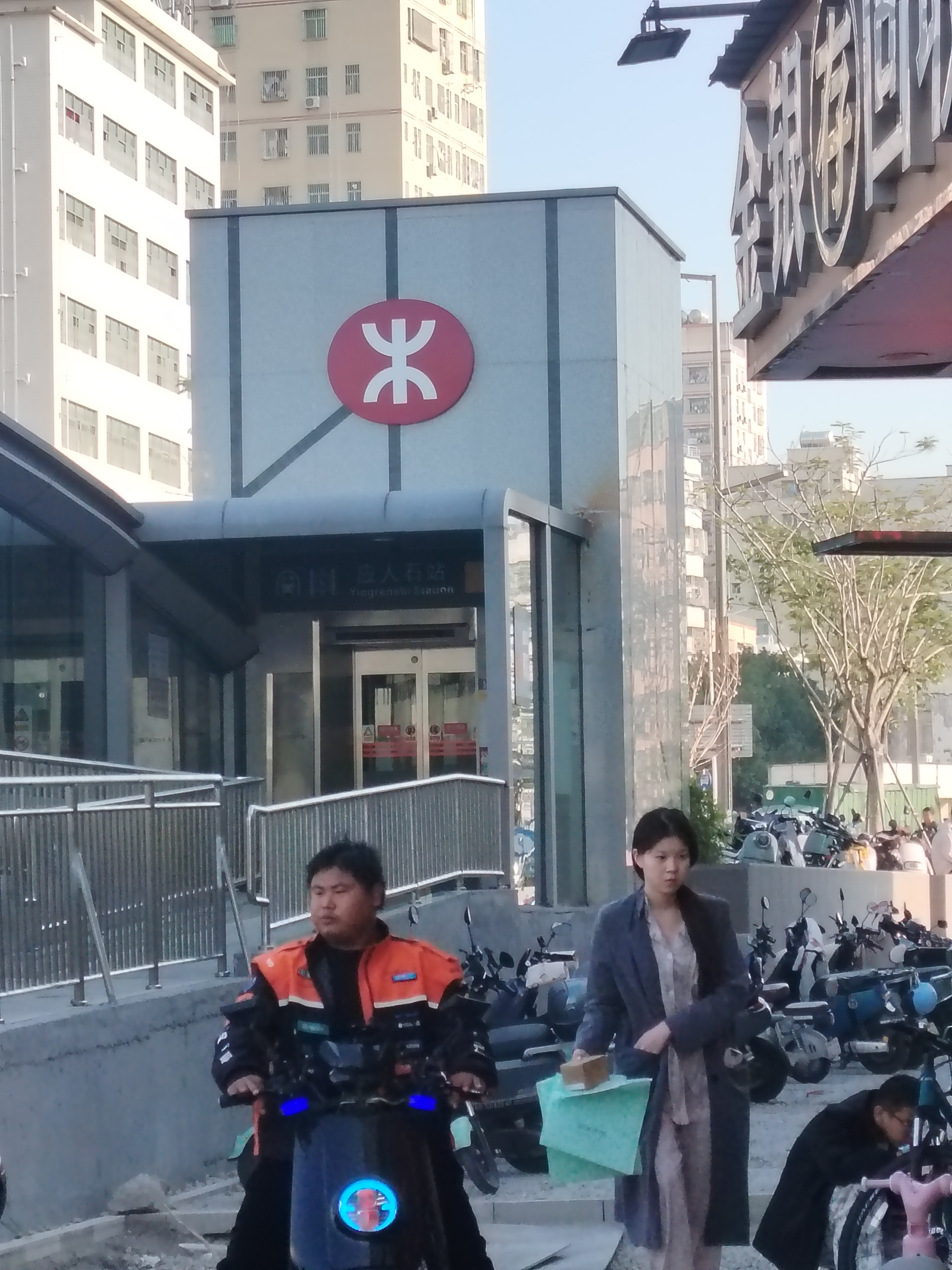
Entrance C (elevator entrance)

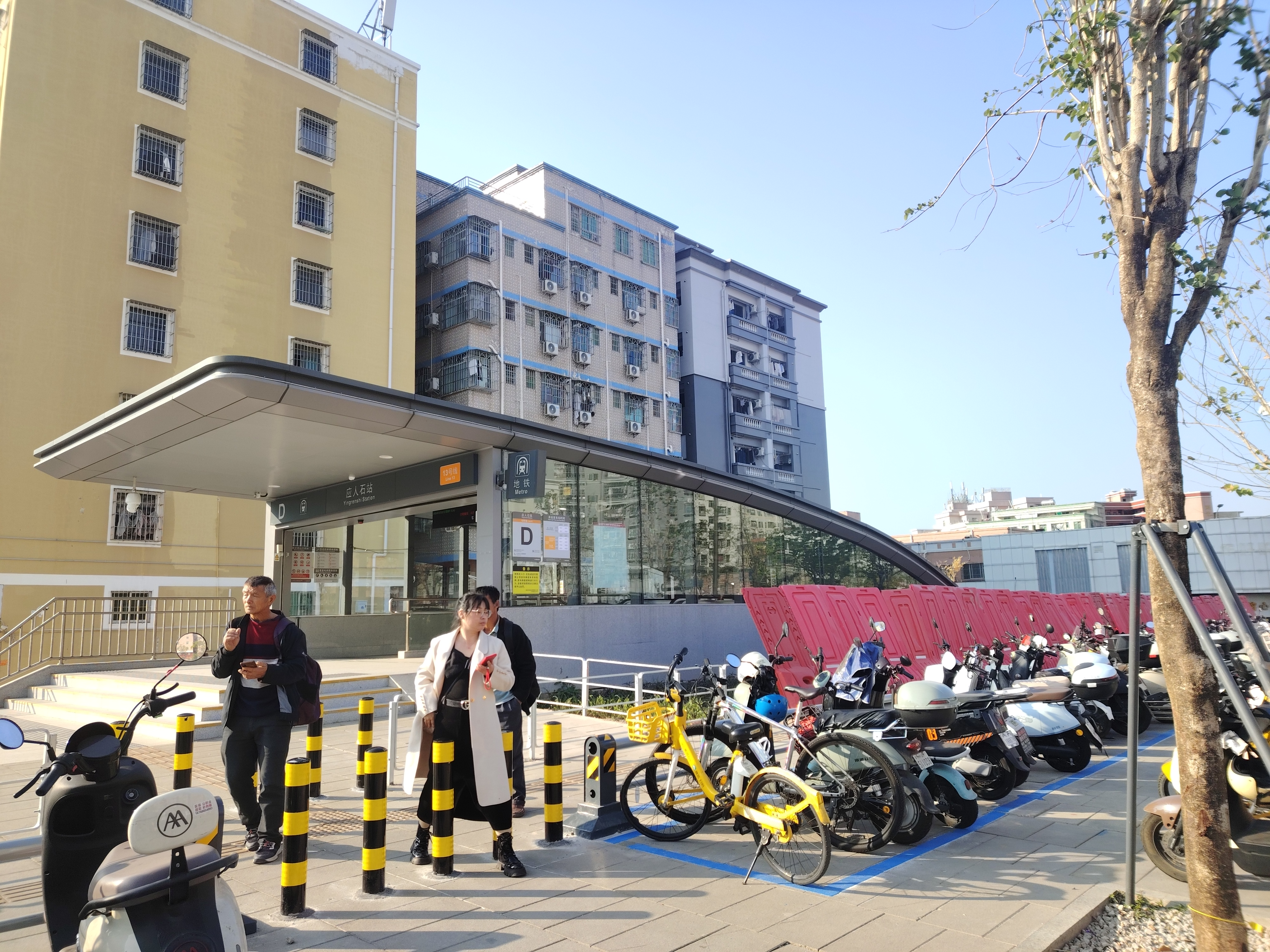
Entrance D

== Construction timeline ==
- On 26 July 2017, Shenzhen Metro Group Co., Ltd. issued the "Environmental Impact Report of Shenzhen Urban Rail Transit Line 13 Project", which includes this station, and the project is named Yingrenshi Station.
- On 17 January 2022, the second phase of traffic diversion at this station was successfully completed.
- On 22 April 2022, the Shenzhen Municipal Bureau of Planning and Natural Resources issued the Announcement on the Approval of the Plan for the Station Names of Relevant Lines of the Fourth Phase of Shenzhen Metro, and the station kept the planning name of "Yingrenshi Station".
- On 28 December 2025, the station officially opened along with the new stations of Line 13's Phase 1 North Section (except Xili HSR station).
