= Movie camera =

Special type of camera used to shoot movies

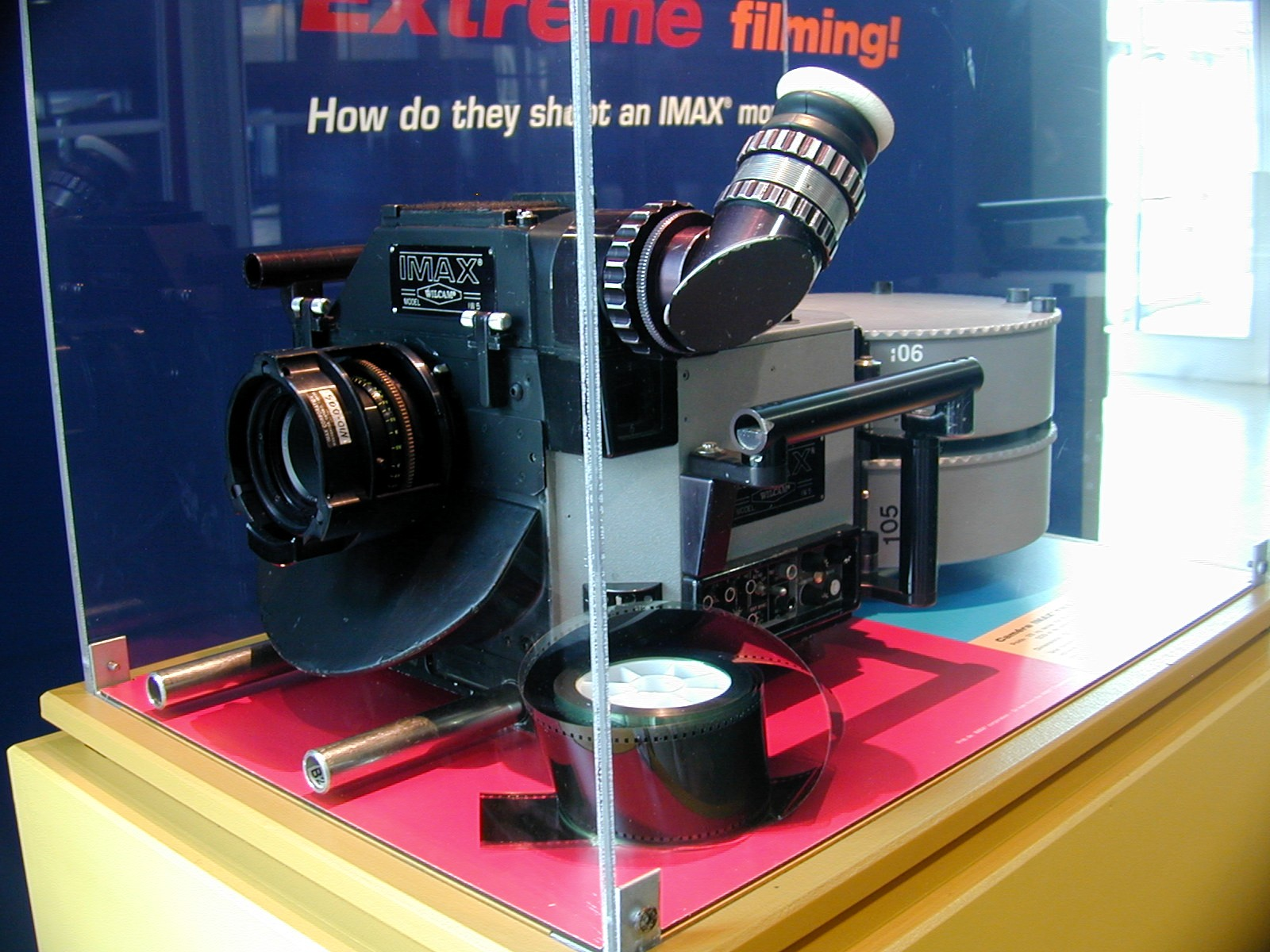
An IMAX cinema camera, displayed at the National Science and Media Museum, Bradford, England.

A movie camera (also known as a motion picture camera, or cine-camera) is a type of photographic camera that rapidly takes a sequence of photographs, either onto film stock or an image sensor, in order to produce a moving image to display on a screen. In contrast to the still camera, which captures a single image at a time, the movie camera takes a series of images by way of an intermittent mechanism or by electronic means; each image is a frame of film or video. The frames are projected through a movie projector or a video projector at a specific frame rate to show the moving picture. The historical answer to the eye and brain's ability to perceive separate frames as continuous and smooth moving images was persistence of vision, but phi phenomenon and beta movement are explanations developed in the 20th century. Higher frame rates allow for the perception of smoother motion, while lower frame rates will produce flicker or strobe effects.

== History ==
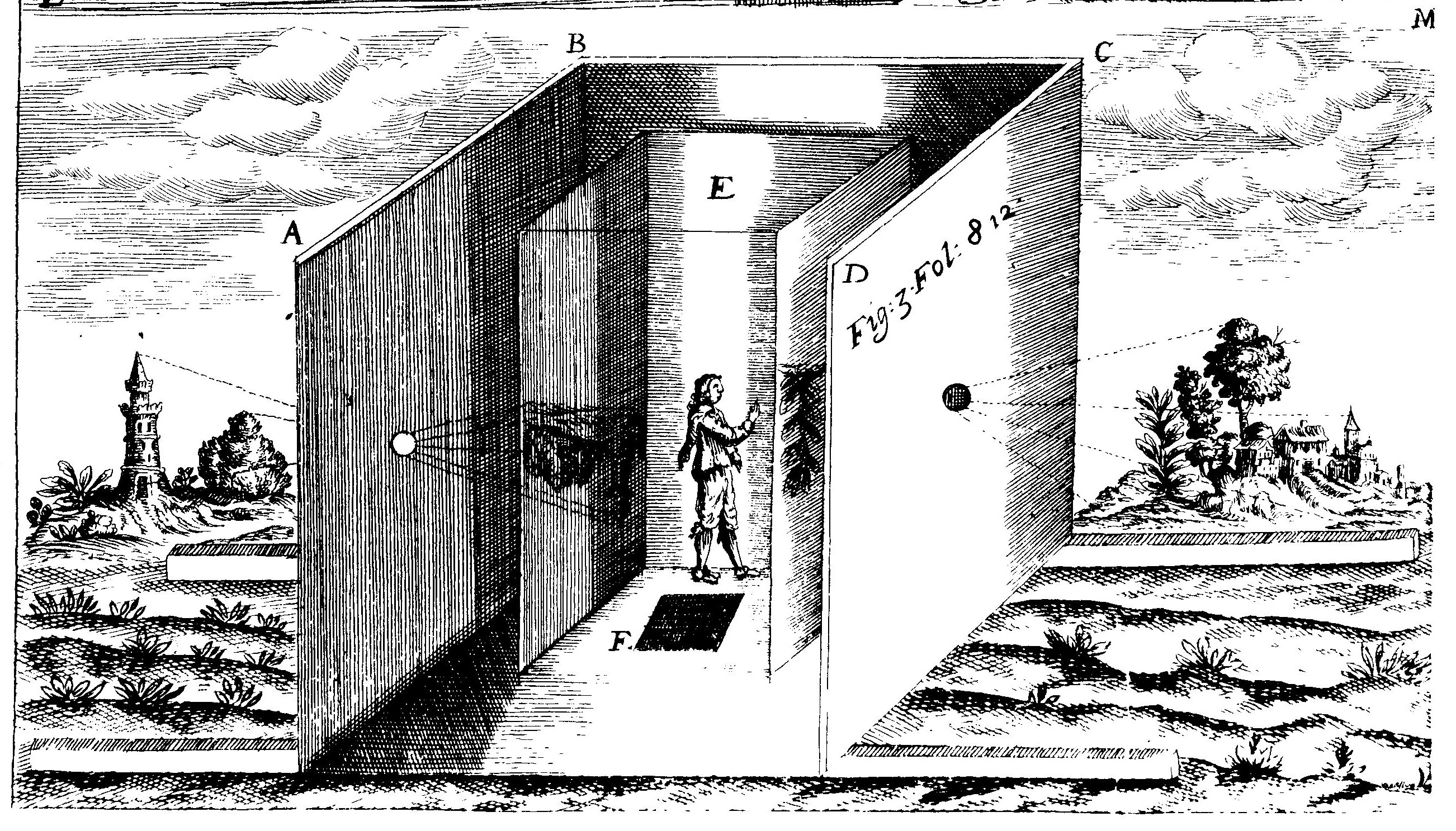
Illustration of a "portable" camera obscura in Kircher's Ars Magna Lucis et Umbrae (1645)

Screen practice itself goes back to the 1600s, when images were first projected by various means, including the magic lantern. The development of this screen practice went through several technological stages, including the invention of the magic lantern, the projection of photographic images, the motion picture, and eventually the synchronization of sound and film. The earliest research into image projection was Athanasius Kircher's 1645 work Ars Magna Lucis et Umbrae, which described images being reflected onto a wall in a darkened room. Kircher described and illustrated his designs, intending to demystify the technology and effect for viewers of such apparatus. He emphasized that the combination of narration and images granted the ability to express narrative.

The development of the motion picture camera comes from this tradition of technological development, and the desire to create more life-like images to project on screen for audiences. Magic lantern shows would have slides that moved, being manipulated by the projectionist. Other devices, developed by photographers like Eadweard Muybridge and Coleman Sellers II, focused on sequential images that when shown in rapid succession created the illusion of movement through what was then described as the persistence of vision but is now considered a result of phi phenomenon and beta movement.

=== Development ===
In 1845, Francis Ronalds developed a photosensitive machine at the Kew Observatory. A photosensitive surface was drawn slowly past the aperture diaphragm of the camera by a clockwork mechanism to enable continuous recording over a 12- or 24-hour period. Ronalds applied his cameras to trace the ongoing variations of scientific instruments and they were used in observatories around the world for over a century.

Animation of The Horse in Motion, excluding 12th frame where the horse is standing still.

In 1876, Wordsworth Donisthorpe and his cousin William Carr Crofts proposed a camera to take sequential pictures on glass plates, later to be printed on a roll of paper film. In 1889, he would patent a moving picture camera in which the film moved continuously. Both devices were called the Kinesigraph. In June 1878, Eadweard Muybridge created sequential series of photographs with a battery of 12 cameras along the race track at Stanford's Palo Alto Stock Farm (now the campus of Stanford University). John D. Isaacs, a technical expert at Stanford's Central Pacific Railway, was brought in to design the electromagnetic shutters and trip-wire system for the cameras. The subjects to be photographed stood against a white background with black vertical lines. Each frame was exposed for 1/500th of a second, and each exposure was separated by 1/25th of a second. The cameras were activated by the subjects (animals) snapping strings. By June 1878, Muybridge was able to photograph the racehorse Sallie Gardner. In 1879, Muybridge would develop an elaborate magic lantern attachment that he named the Zoopraxiscope, capable of replaying his photograph sequences. Around this time he began to photograph other animals and human subjects.

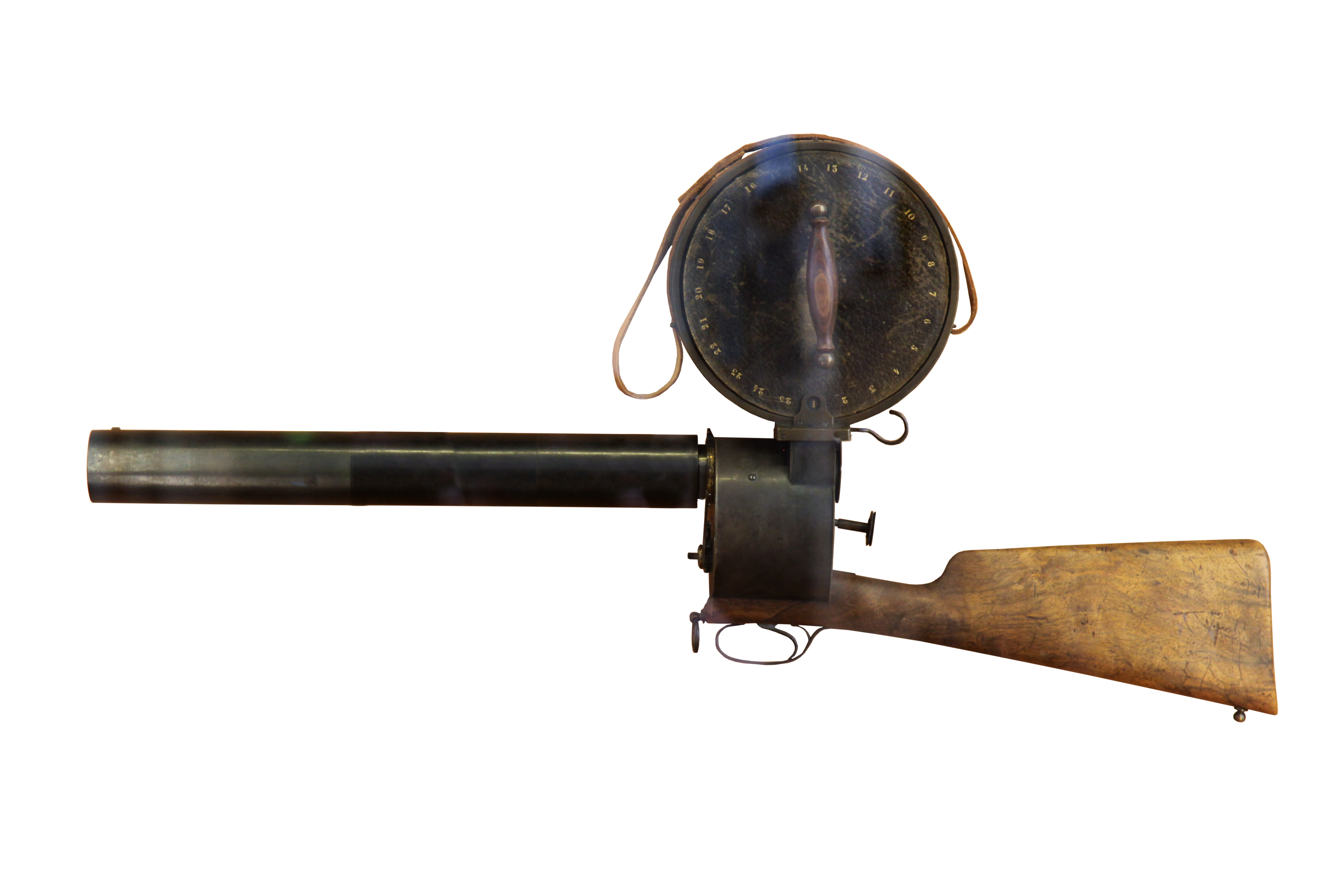
The chronophotographic gun invented by Étienne-Jules Marey.

In 1882, Étienne-Jules Marey, a French scientist developed the chronophotographic gun, which could shoot 12 images per second and was the first photographic device to capture moving images on a plate using a metal shutter. Around 1888, Frenchman Louis Le Prince designed and described multiple camera systems with varying numbers of lenses. One prototype included a 16-lens system, which was developed at his workshop in Leeds. The first 8 lenses would be triggered in rapid succession by an electromagnetic shutter on the sensitive film; the film would then be moved forward allowing the other 8 lenses to operate on the film. After much trial and error, he was finally able to develop a single-lens camera in 1888, which he used to shoot sequences of moving pictures on paper film, including the Roundhay Garden Scene and Traffic Crossing Leeds Bridge.

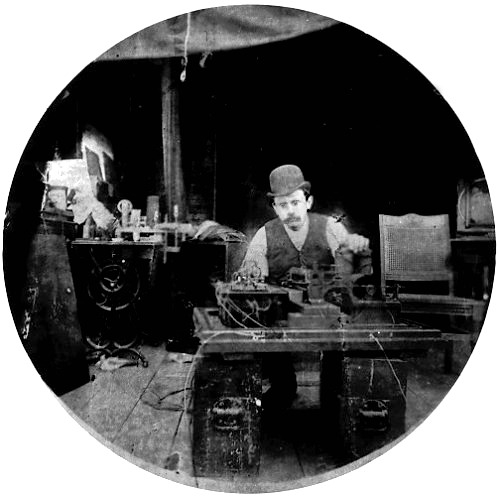
Charles Kayser of the Edison lab seated behind the Kinetograph.

Another early pioneer was the British inventor William Friese-Greene. In 1887, he began to experiment with the use of paper film, made transparent through oiling, to record motion pictures. He also said he attempted using experimental celluloid, made with the help of Alexander Parkes. In 1889, Friese-Greene took out a patent for a moving picture camera that was capable of taking up to ten photographs per second. Another model, built in 1890, used rolls of the new Eastman celluloid film, which he had perforated. A full report on the patented camera was published in the British Photographic News on February 28, 1890. He showed his cameras and film shot with them on many occasions, but never projected his films in public. He also sent details of his invention to the American inventor Thomas Edison in February 1890. After a meeting with Muybridge, Edison coined the terms Kinetograph and Kinetoscope for his envisioned devices which would capture moving images and replay them respectively. He then drew initial designs. Edison, who had already invented the phonograph, wrote that he was "experimenting upon an instrument which does for the Eye what the phonograph does for the Ear, which is the recording and reproduction of things in motion, and in such a form as to be both Cheap [sic] practical and convenient." His initial invention was a cylinder with images engraved on its surface in a spiral pattern and to be viewed through a microscope.

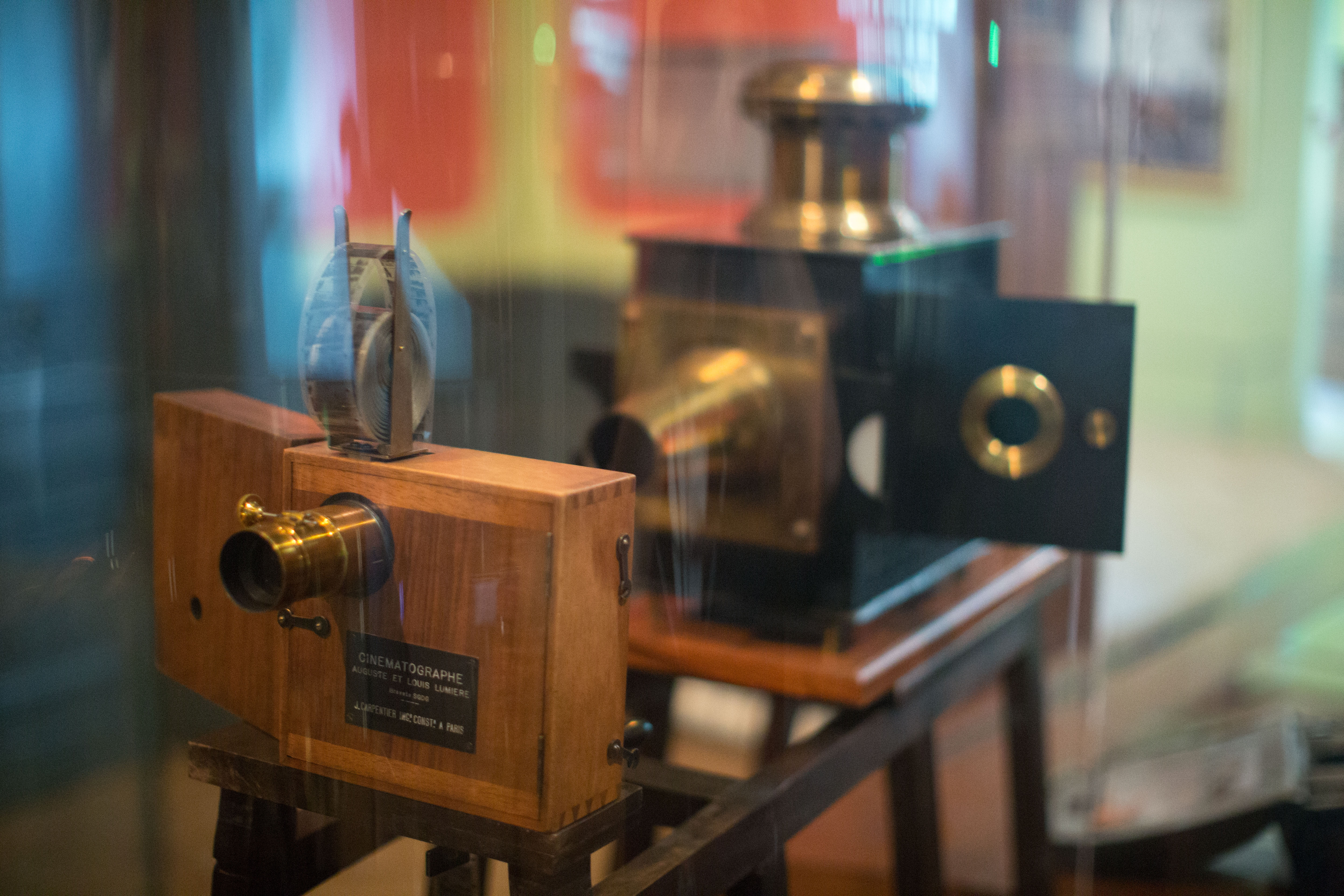
The Cinematograph, conceived by Auguste and Louis Lumière in Lyon, France.

William Kennedy Laurie Dickson, a Scottish inventor and employee of Edison, designed the Kinetograph Camera in 1891. The camera was powered by an electric motor and was capable of shooting with the new perforated film. To govern the intermittent movement of the film in the camera, allowing the strip to stop long enough so each frame could be fully exposed and then advancing it quickly (in about 1/460 of a second) to the next frame, the sprocket wheel that engaged the strip was driven by an escapement disc mechanism—the first practical system for the high-speed stop-and-go film movement that would be the foundation for the next century of cinematography. In 1893 Auguste and Louis Lumière collaborated with Georges Demenÿ, who proposed using an intermittent mechanism similar to that inside a sewing machine to transport film. The chief mechanic at the Lumière Factory in Lyon, Charles Moisson, helped design and build their combined camera-projector system, which they named the Cinematograph. The intention was only to produce short sequences of image, so the capacity for film was kept to approximately 55 feet (17-18 meters). The camera initially used photographic paper, but later the Lumière brothers shifted to celluloid film, which they bought from New-York's Celluloid Manufacturing Co. This they covered with their own emulsion, and had it cut into strips and perforated. In 1894, the Polish inventor Kazimierz Prószyński constructed a projector and camera in one, an invention he called the Pleograph.

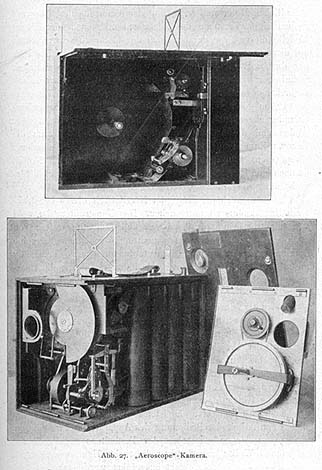
The Aeroscope (1909) was the first hand-held movie camera.

=== Mass-market ===
Due to the work of Le Prince, Friese-Greene, Edison, and the Lumière brothers, the movie camera had become a practical reality by the mid-1890s. The first firms were soon established for the manufacture of movie cameras, including Arri, Bell & Howell, Birt Acres, Eclair, Eugene Augustin Lauste, Dickson, Gaumont, Lytax, Mitchell Camera, Pathé Frères, Schneider Kreuznach, Universal Camera Corp., and others.

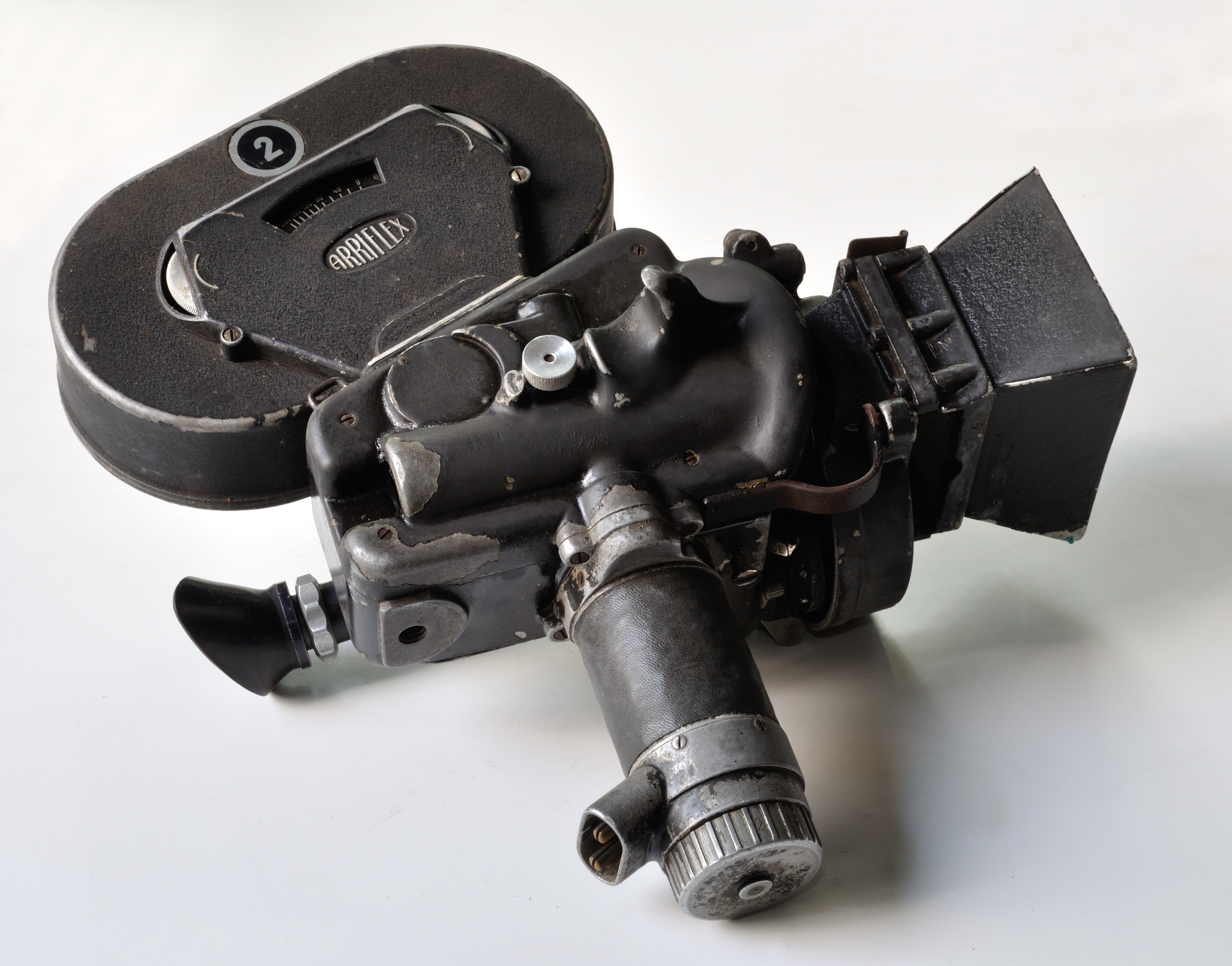
An Arriflex 35 cine camera. The first movie camera to allow for single-lens reflex viewing to avoid parallax distortion.

The Aeroscope was built and patented in England in the period 1909–1911 by Polish inventor Kazimierz Prószyński. Aeroscope was the first successful hand-held operated film camera. The cameraman did not have to turn the crank to advance the film, as in all cameras of that time, so he could operate the camera with both hands, holding the camera and controlling the focus. This made it possible to film with the Aeroscope in difficult circumstances including from the air and for military purposes. The first all-metal cine camera was the Bell & Howell Standard of 1911-12.

Mitchell Cameras were one of the primary cameras used in the production of newsreels and Hollywood movies from around 1929, when Fox Studios bought Mitchell, until the Mitchell closed in the 1970s. Their main camera was the Mitchell Standard. During World War II, cinematographers working as field photographers made use of Bell & Howell Eyemo cameras if they were American or Arri Arriflex 35 cameras if they were German. The Arriflex 35s were brought back to the United States after the war via the US Army Pictorial Center and became popular due to the camera's mirrored, twin-bladed shutter, which allowed for single-lens reflex viewing. In a single-lens reflex system, the viewfinder looks directly through the lens, rather than a second, nearby lens. This allows the camera operator to see exactly what will be photographed. During the 1950s, Panavision cameras were brought into use, allowing the adoption of the anamorphic widescreen process.

=== Digital movie cameras ===
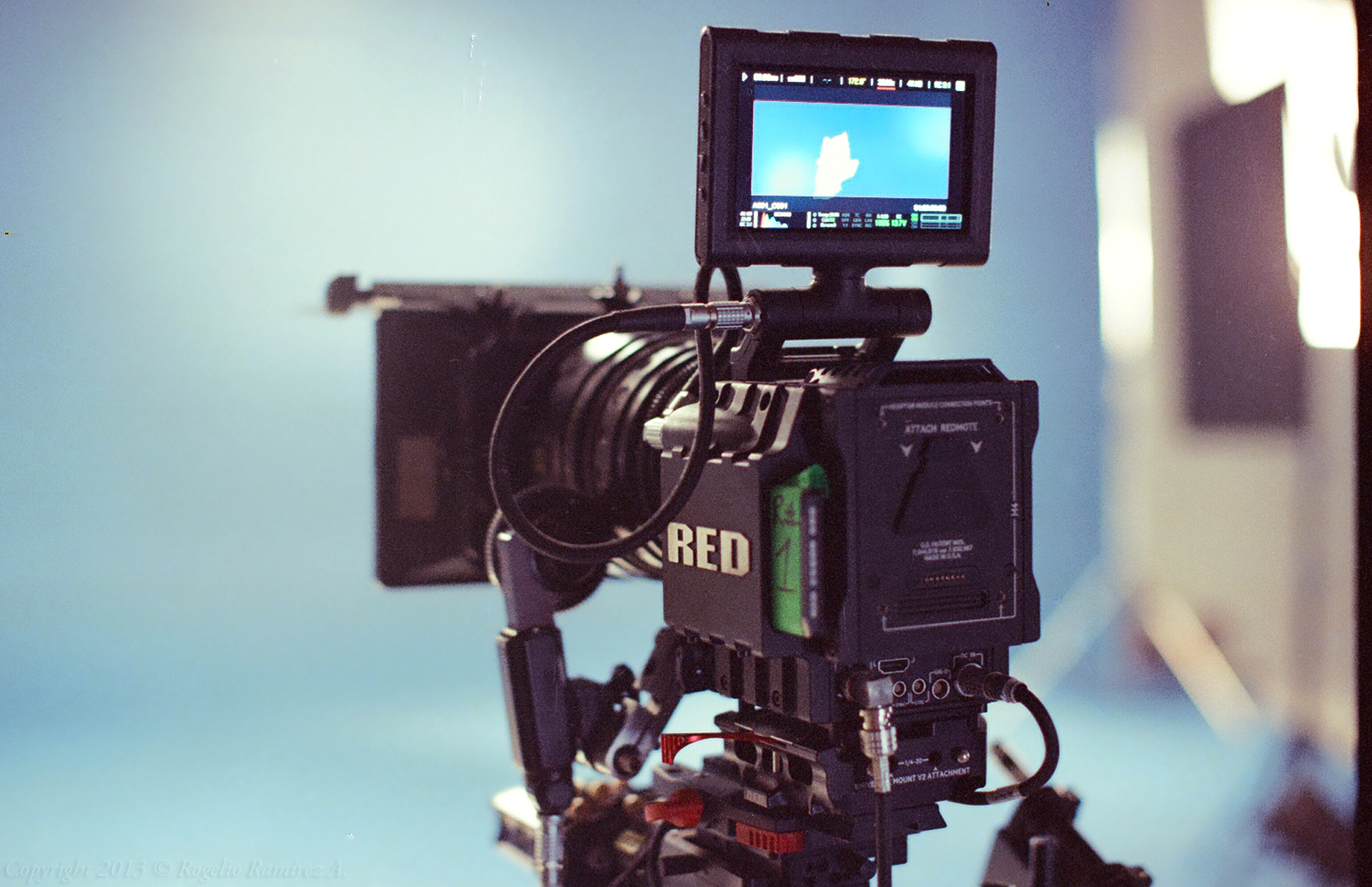
The RED EPIC camera has been used to shoot numerous feature films—including The Amazing Spiderman and The Hobbit.

Experiments with electronic moving images date back to the use of selenium solar cells and the transmission by wire of their signal in the 1880s. But the first widespread use came after the invention of the Baird Televisor by John Logie Baird, when tube amplifier gave the ability to strengthen the signals created by solar cells. Baird then captured lines of light using a scanning system through a Nipkow disk. In his early work, he could successfully transmit captured images, but the images were low quality and could not be stored. His work eventually led to broadcast television. The first fully digital still photography camera was designed and built by Steven Sasson, an employee at Eastman Kodak in Rochester, New York in 1975. The camera used a CCD sensor.

Digital movie cameras do not use analog film stock to capture images, as had been the standard since the 1890s. In digital technology, there are two common image sensors that replaced solar cells: the CCD sensor and the CMOS sensor. Captured images are then recorded on a storage medium like a hard drive or flash memory—using a variety of acquisition formats. Digital SLR cameras (DSLR) designed for consumer use have also been used for some low-budget independent productions. Since the 2010s, digital movie cameras have become the dominant type of camera in the motion picture industry, being employed in movies and television productions, although analog film is still used as well.

== Technical details ==
=== Camera mechanics ===
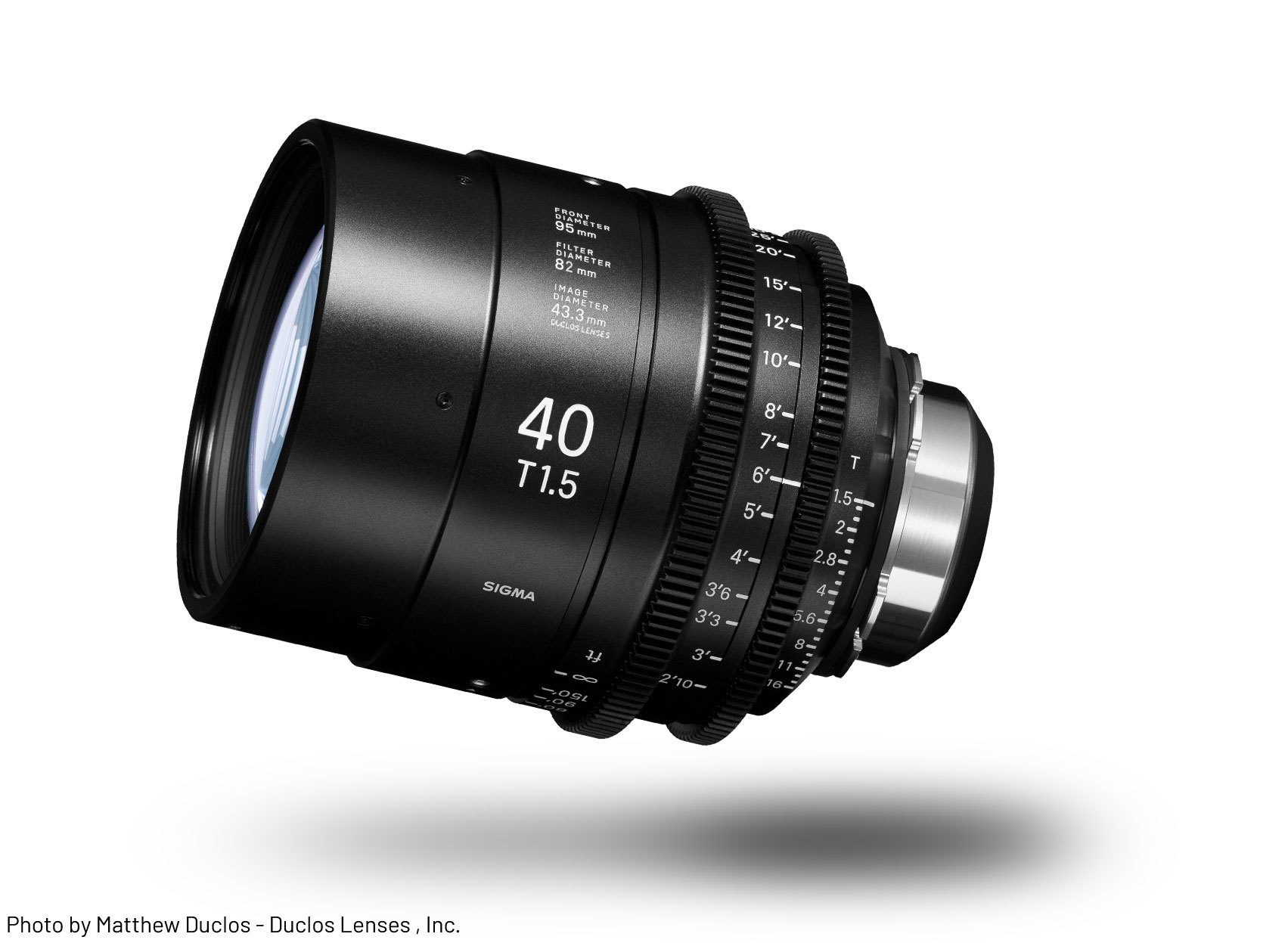
A modern Sigma Cine 40mm T1.5 with a PL lens mount.

==== The lens ====
The basic form of a camera is a box with a hole to allow in light, a portable camera obscura. These smaller portable versions are pinhole cameras. Camera obscuras were used to view solar eclipses, and eventually included converging lenses. Overtime the lenses were moved out of the camera body into external attachments with various glass elements contained in a barrel, with a lens mount on one end to attach to the camera body. Internal to the lens is a series of blades called the aperture that close in a circular fashion, changing the amount of light that goes through the lens and enters the camera body. Changing the aperture changes the depth of field, which allows for selective focus in the image. Apertures are typically measured in f-stops. By manipulating the placement of the internal glass elements, the area of the image that is in focus can be changed.

When the shutter is open, the film is illuminated. When the shutter is closed, the film strip is moved one frame.

==== The shutter ====
Internal to the camera's body is the shutter, which is designed to momentarily block light from entering the camera body and striking the imaging medium (which may be photographic film or a digital sensor). In motion picture film cameras, the shutter must move in time with the movement of the film and the camera's set frame rate. Early examples of motion picture camera shutters that allowed for this timing were half circles that spun. Cameras can have shutters at different angles to the film gate and with a different number of blades, depending on their design. In 1937, Erich Kästner designed the mirrored shutter, which allowed camera operators to see through the lens for the first time and avoid parallax between what they saw and photographed.

A 16mm film projector where the lens, multi-bladed shutter, sprocket wheels, Latham loops, and pull-down mechanism are all seen operating in synchronization. Used to illustrate what is encased in a camera.

==== The film movement ====
The motion picture film is perforated, allowing sprockets in the camera to grab and move the film through the camera at a controlled, predictable rate. The rate the film moves through the body and is exposed to light is the frame rate. Early cameras were not motorized but instead used hand cranks on the exterior body to move the film through the camera, resulting in variable and inconsistent frame rates. Roughly 16 frames per second was something of a standard, because it captured fairly smooth motion while saving money on film. Frame rates below 10 or 12 frames per second tend to look like individual images, rather than continuous motion.

As the film moves, two elements play into its precision: advancement (the ability to move from one frame to the next) and registration (the ability to hold the film steady during exposure to light). Advancement occurs via a mechanism called the pull-down claw, which grabs the perforations and moves the film one frame away from the film gate. Registration is achieved via one or more pins that engage the perforations while in the film gate to hold it still during exposure to light. During this intermittent (stop-and-go) motion of the film, the celluloid is under intense tension that can cause it to break. For this reason, on either side of the film gate, loops are formed to alleviate tension on the film. These loops are necessary in both film projectors and film cameras to prevent the film from breaking.

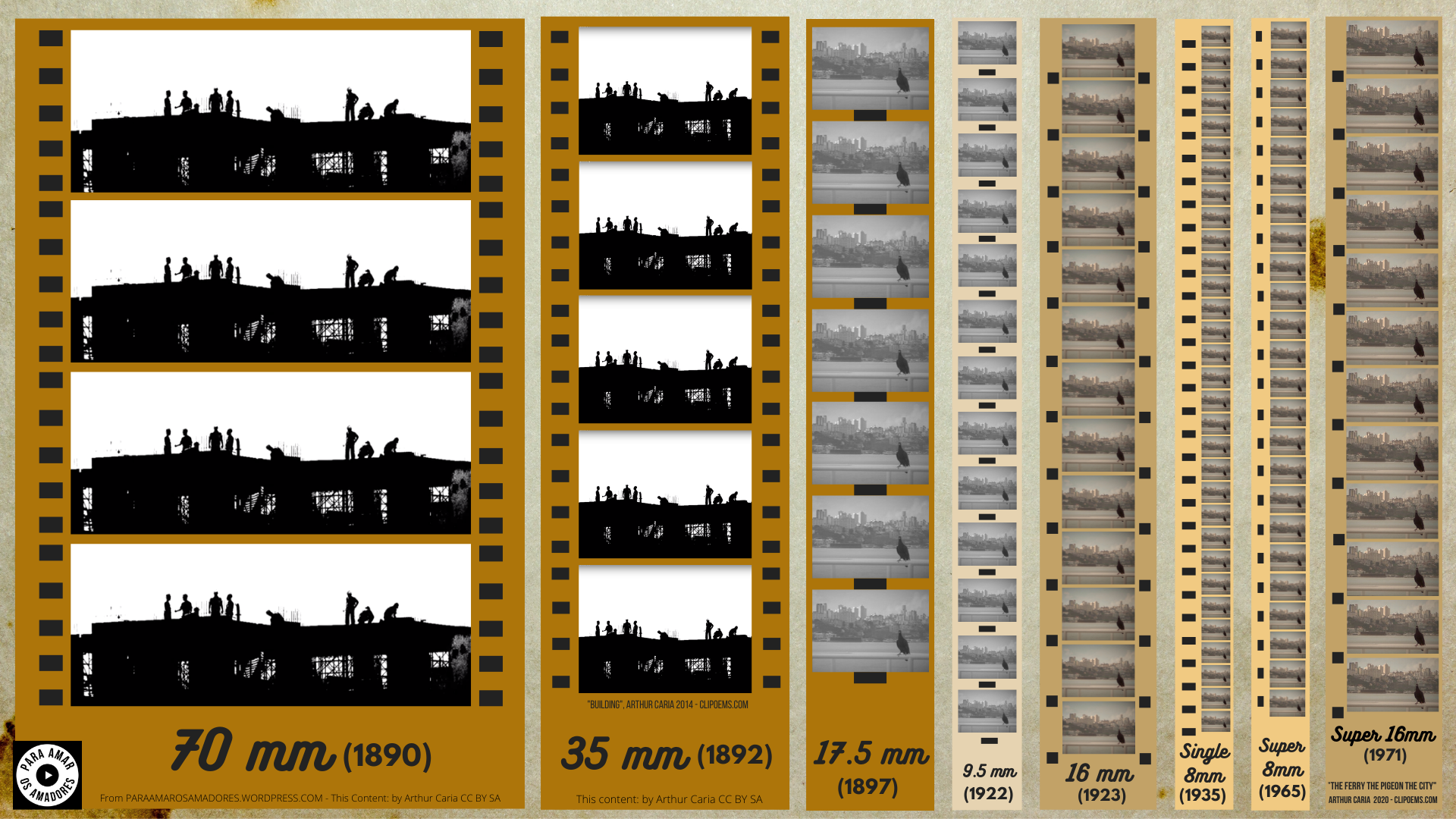
Illustration of various film gauges. From left to right: 70mm, 35mm, 17.5mm, 9.5mm, 16mm, Single 8mm, Super 8mm, Super 16mm.

==== The film ====
All photographic film is made up of at least two layers, a film base and an emulsion, often with a binder holding them together. When assembled, a strip of film is approximately 120 to 145 microns (μm) thick, with slight variation by manufacturer. Along the edges of the film are film perforations (also called sprocket holes), which allow the film to be moved through the camera. Various kinds of perforations exist, with standards for various film gauge. The standards vary by size, separation (called pitch), and shape. The film gauge is the width of the film (measured in millimeters). The gauges typically used in professional settings are Super 8, 16 mm, 35 mm, and 65 mm. Super 8 and 16mm are often used in low-budget films, while 35mm is standardized for higher-end professional production, and 65mm is the format used for large-format screens like IMAX. Films shot on smaller formats can be enlarged to other formats, such as 16mm to 35mm, or 35mm to 65mm.

=== Aspect ratios ===
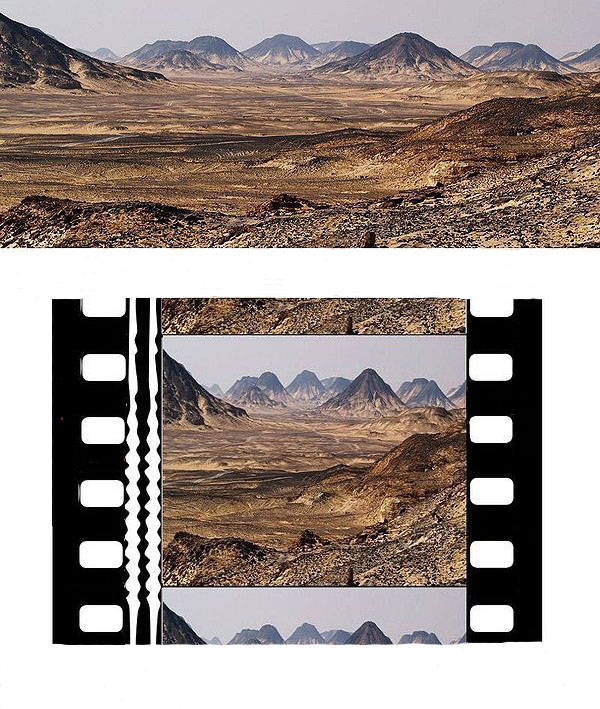
Comparison between an unsqueezed original scene and the image as it appears on the 35mm film in an anamorphic process.

A film's aspect ratio is the shape of the image and is independent of the film gauge (eg. 35 mm or 65 mm) on which it was shot. The aspect ratio is describe as the width of the image divided by its height, and is expressed as a ratio with height as the unity, such as 1.78:1. The standardized aspect ratio for motion pictures with sound was the Academy ratio of 1.37:1 until the introduction of CinemaScope's 2.55:1 anamorphic aspect ratio in 1955. Silent films and those without a printed audio track (such as films which used sound-on-disc systems) used a 1.33:1 aspect ratio. The earliest sound films used an aspect ratio of 1.18:1.

==== Anamorphic widescreen ====
In the United States, the two most common aspect ratios are 1.85:1 (called flat) and 2.40:1 (called 'scope). These terms arise from the differences between the Academy ratio of 1.37:1, and CinemaScope's 2.55:1 which was captured on the same image area but with an anamorphic lens rather than a spherical lens. Spherical lenses focus light onto the imaging area (photographic film or an image sensor) without changing any features of its aspect ratio, while anamorphic lenses compress the image in one direction (usually horizontally, its long side) by a factor of two. This compression of the image is stretched either during post-production or when the film is projected. The anamorphic system allows for more image information to be captured in the same imaging area and allows for widescreen. Another method to achieve widescreen is to shoot in the standard 1.37:1 aspect ratio and then to matte the top and bottom of image during projection.

A top-down diagram of the Cinerama projection process.

==== Multiple cameras ====
Multiple cameras may be placed side-by-side to record a single angle of a scene, with the intention of being projected together to produce a larger image than one camera could produce. This can be done to produce seamless images like in How the West Was Won, or collages of images like in Napoléon.

In the Cinerama process, a camera with three lenses captured the scene on three strips of film simultaneously. Projection then took place from three projectors, pointed at a screen to create a seamless image, with a fourth strip of film that carried seven tracks of audio. Cinerama used three strips of standard 35 mm movie film, traveling at 24 frames per second, with an aspect ratio of 2.55:1. Circle-Vision 360° is a similar technology, which makes use of nine cameras aligned in a circle to capture a 360° image.

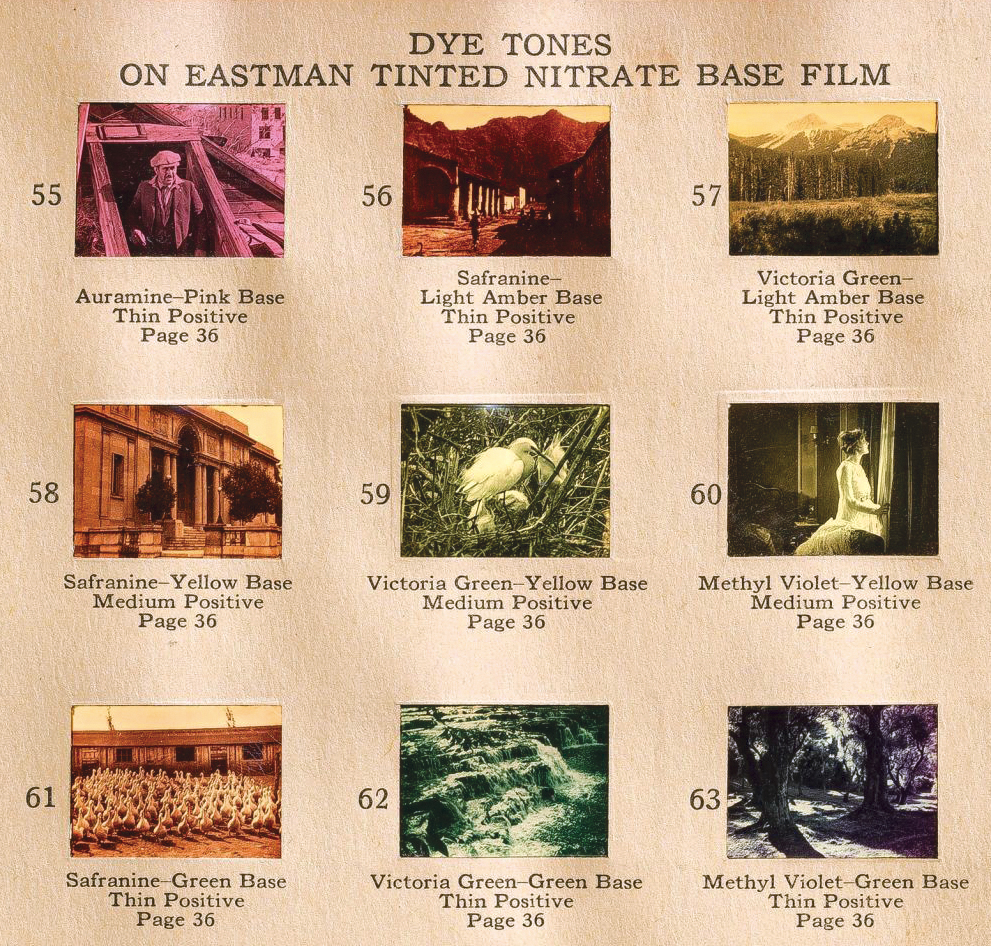
A display page from Eastman Kodak showing the various tints and tones available for motion pictures, ca. 1927.

=== Color processes ===
The misconception exists that all early films were made to be seen in black and white, but this is incorrect. From the earliest days of cinema, films were projected with color created via hand coloring, film tinting or toning, or mixtures of these processes. Existing nitrate film prints, surviving film distributor catalogues, and even paper documentation demonstrate that films were available to theaters in black and white and color versions. Films would also use a mixtures of colors throughout, or black and white and color, depending on content, with color being more common in dramatic films than comedies; and a film's production budget did not necessarily dictate whether it was available in color or not.

==== Applied color ====
Hand-colouring is a manual process by which each frame of a film is painted or drawn on, either freehand or with a stencil. This was the common practice before the widespread availability of chromogenic photography. Sometimes the color was used throughout the entire image, like in Auguste and Louis Lumière's film Mort de Marat (1897 film), while other times color was used selectively on specific objects in a scene, like in William Kennedy Dickson's Annabelle Serpentine Dance. Color may also be used only in specific scenes during a film, like in The Great Train Robbery by Edwin S. Porter. Finally, coloring may not be exactly the same between prints, containing slight or significant differences.

==== Natural color ====
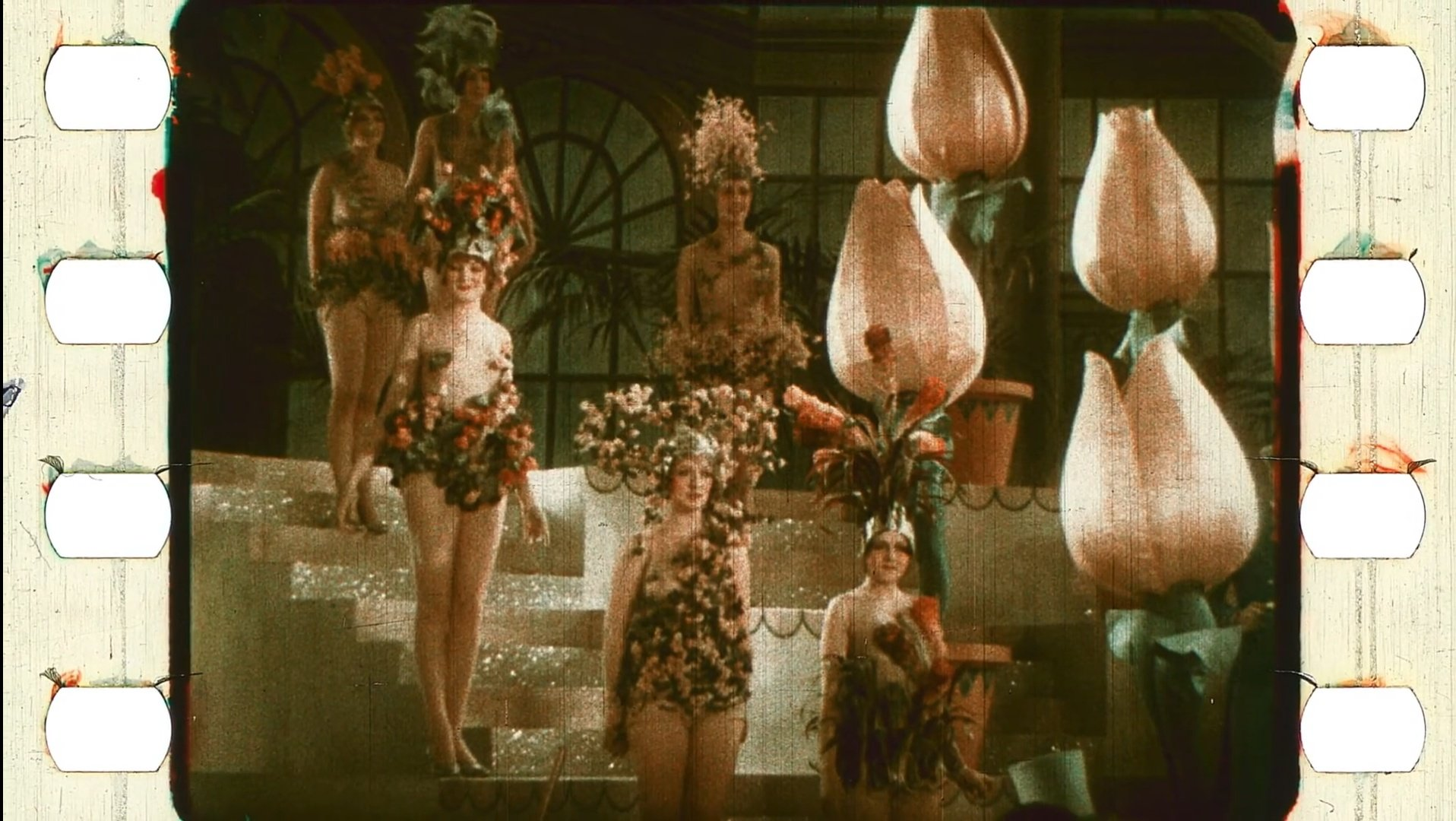
A still frame from Gold Diggers of Broadway, a 1929 film shot in Technicolor Process 3, a two-color process.

Natural color can be achieved through either additive color or subtractive color systems. In an additive system, when the primary colors are mixed, white light is made; while in a subtractive system the primary colors mix, block light and create black. The Finlay colour process was an additive system where a color mosaic influenced the underlying black and white image, allowing a color image to be seen. Other systems, like Technicolor Process 1, used a beam splitter to record the scene through two color filters (one red and one green) onto two strips of black and white film. The images were then projected through alternating, corresponding red and green filters in the film projector, allowing the display of color. Technicolor Process 4 also used a beam splitter, through three color filters onto three strips of black and white film, but the projection prints were made via a dye-transfer process. The final development was chromogenic photography, first brought into widespread use through the Eastman Kodak company's Kodachrome 16mm reversal film. Kodachrome captured natural color in a single strip of film (called a monopack) via different layers of light-sensitive film emulsion. In digital cinema cameras one strategy for capturing color is the use of a Bayer filter, which records colors on the camera's image sensor via red, green, and blue sensitive areas and then blends the colors via interpolation.

=== Sound synchronization ===
In order to achieve higher quality audio, sound is usually recorded on a separate device than the camera. This is called double-system recording. While on set, the camera records the image under the operation of the camera operator, while the sound is recorded by an audio engineer on an audio recorder. In order to ensure sync sound is achieved, a clapperboard is used. During post-production, the sound of the clapperboard on the audio track is aligned with the image of the clapperboard captured by the camera, which will align the audio and image tracks.

==== Post-production sound ====
In some instances, sound is not recorded on set or must be replaced in post-production. Shooting without sound is called shooting MOS. The origin of the term MOS is unclear, but simply means to film without sound. When dialogue is added in post-production, it is through a process called ADR (automated dialogue replacement) or dubbing. Sound effects can be added by a sound editor, or through the foley process.

== Amateur and home movie cameras ==
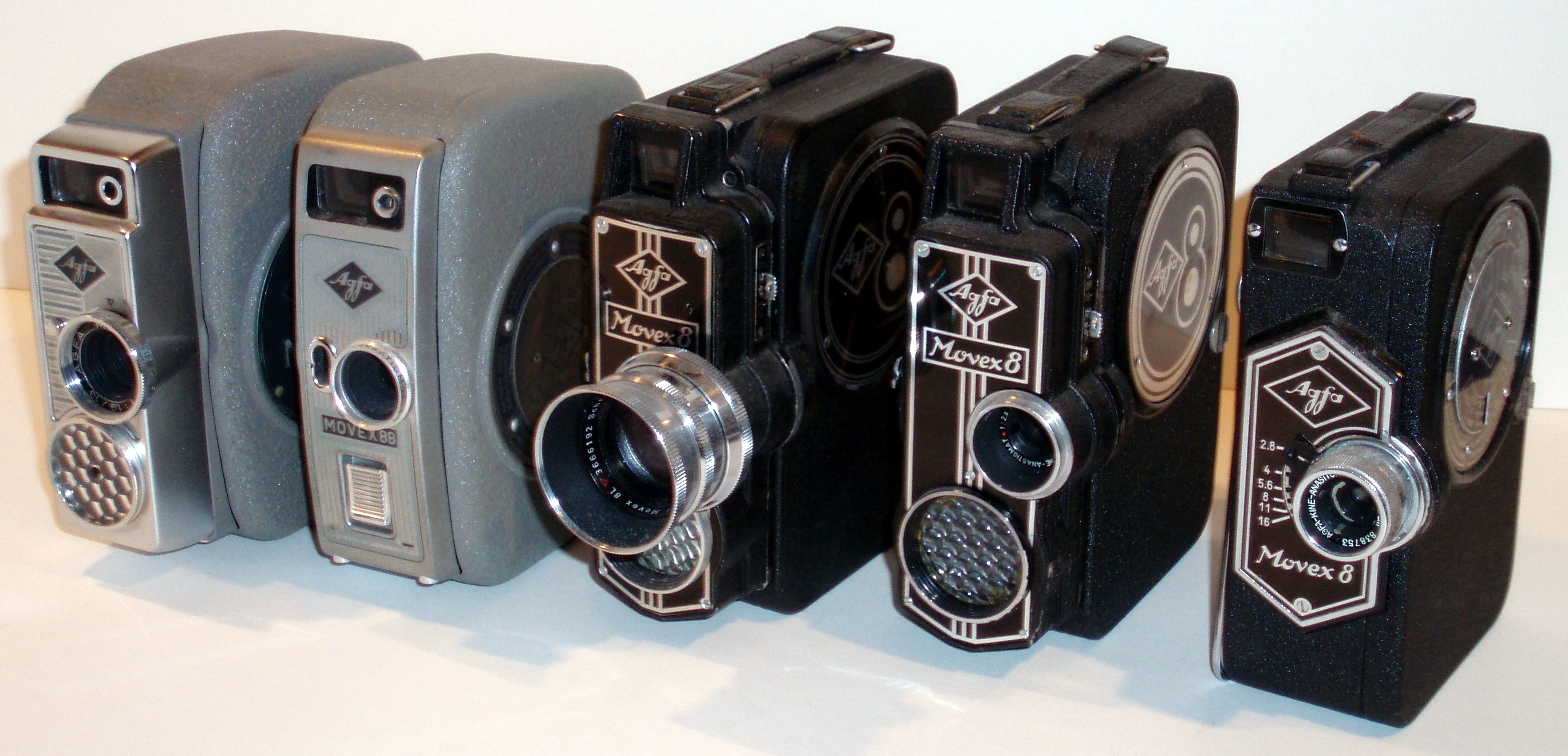
Various German Agfa Movex Standard 8 home movie cameras

Various small gauges of motion picture film formats have been produced since the 1910s, not only intending to bring the tools for filmmaking to an amateur and mass audience, but also film exhibition and film projection. Formats like 8mm, 9.5 mm, 16 mm, and Super 8 were among the small gauges introduced. All of these formats had their own cameras and projector systems, but remained expensive and accessible largely only to the middle class and upper class. 8mm and Super 8, having a much lower financial barrier of entry, created the environment for the creation of home movies to arise as a common family activity. While some 8mm cameras would have a singular fixed lens, higher end cameras (like the Kodak Brownie Turret Movie Camera) would have a turret lens, which allowed two or more lenses to rotate on the front of the camera.

In 1921, an extremely compact 35mm movie camera Kinamo was designed by Emanuel Goldberg for amateur and semi-professional filmmakers. At this time cameras were not motorized but required hand-cranking. This changed when a spring motor attachment was created for the Kinamo in 1923 to allow flexible handheld filming. The Kinamo was used by Joris Ivens and other avant-garde and documentary filmmakers in the late 1920s and early 1930s. In 1925, Eastman Kodak introduced the Ciné-Kodak Model B, which had a spring-wound motor. Other camera manufacturers would produce models for amateurs and semi-professionals, including Bolex, Eclair, Krasnogorsky Zavod, and others.

In the 2000s, with the introduction of the D90, Nikon became the first digital camera manufacturer to add video capture capabilities to a major model of DSLR still photograph camera. Canon Inc. followed shortly thereafter with the 5D Mark II. Smartphone manufacturers began to implement camera and video technology in the 2000s as well.

== See also ==
- Animation camera
- Camcorder
- Camera stabilizer
- Digital movie camera
- Eyemo and Filmo
- History of cinema
- List of film formats
- Konvas
- Multiplane camera
- Debrie Parvo
- Prestwich Camera
- Professional video camera
- Video camera
