= Jerzy Szaniawski =

Polish writer, playwright, and essayist (1886 –1970)

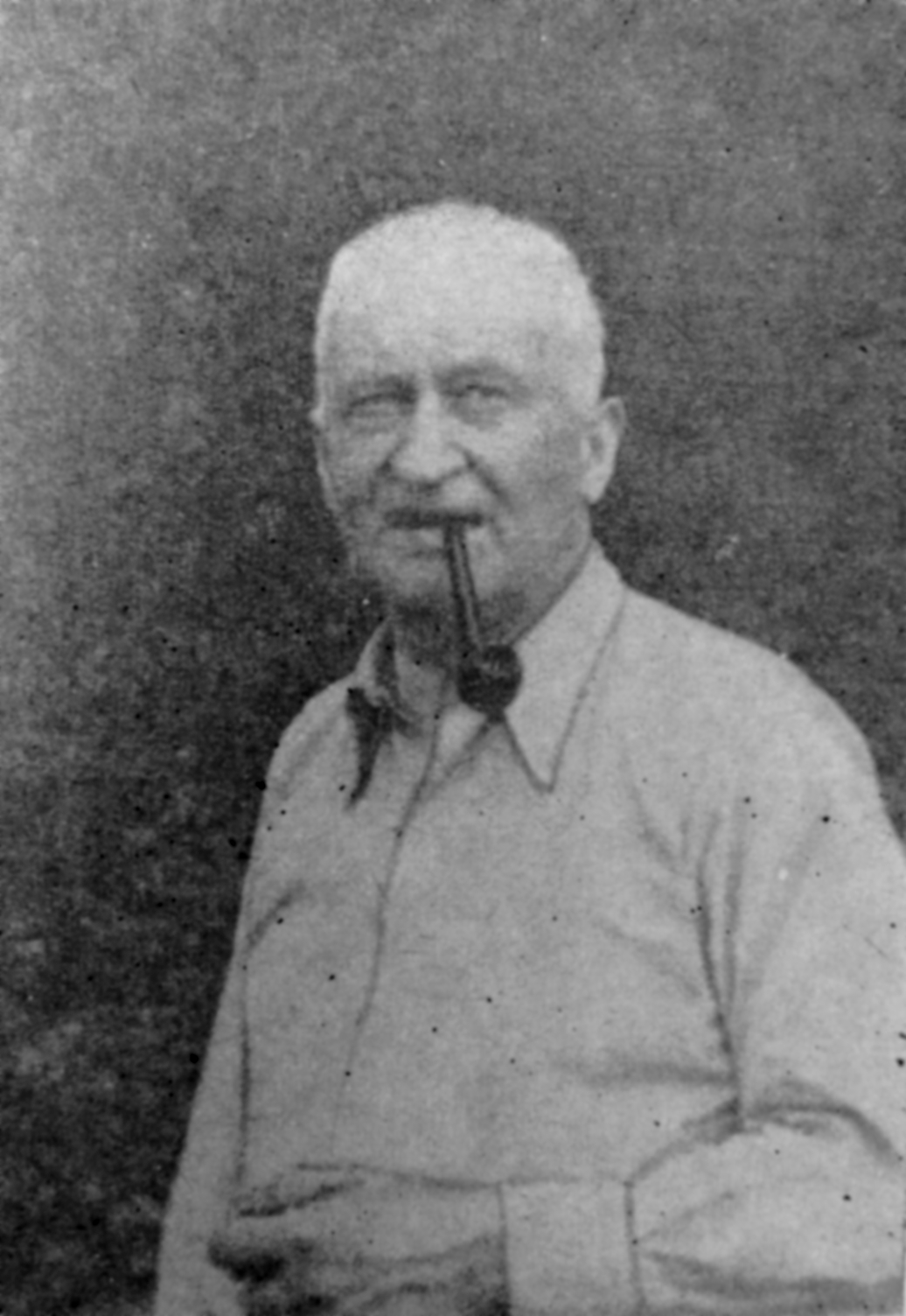
- Born: 10 February 1886; Zegrzynek, Vistula Land, Russian Empire
- Died: 16 March 1970 (aged 84); Warsaw, People's Republic of Poland
- Writing career
- Notable work: Dwa teatry (Two Theatres)

Jerzy Szaniawski (Zegrzynek, 10 February 1886 – 16 March 1970, Warsaw) was a Polish writer, playwright, and essayist; an elected member of the prestigious Polish Academy of Literature in the interwar period. He is best remembered for his series of short stories about the fictitious Professor Tutka, published in daily press in postwar Poland. During Stalinism his writing was temporarily banned as "ideologically adverse".

== Life and artistic career ==
Szaniawski was born into a family of Polish landed gentry at an estate in Zegrzynek in east-central Poland under foreign partitions. His parents belonged to a local cultural elite visited by writers such as Maria Konopnicka and Konrad Prószyński. The estate was nationalized after World War II, but the actual manor remained his until the end of his life. Szaniawski went to school in Warsaw and studied agriculture in Lausanne, France, before returning there. He debuted in 1912 with a series of short novellas published in Kurier Warszawski and in a satirical weekly Sowizdrzał. The stories were soon collected in his volume Łgarze pod Złotą Kotwicą (Liars under a Gold Anchor, 1928). His first play – a comedy entitled Murzyn (1917) – staged by Teatr Polski in Warsaw turned out to be a commercial failure; but his friend and director Aleksander Zelwerowicz took it to Juliusz Słowacki Theatre in Kraków the very same year, where it became a success, staged by Sosnowski with the renowned actress Irena Solska. Since then, his plays were performed regularly by many Polish theatres.

In the 1920s Szaniawski wrote a whole series of stage plays, notably: Papierowy kochanek (Paper-made Lover, 1920), Ewa (1921), Lekkoduch (Trifler, 1923) performed by Reduta; as well as Ptak (Bird, 1923), Żeglarz (Sailor, 1925), and Adwokat i róże (Attorney and roses, 1929) which won the national literary prize a year later. He published his only full-size novel entitled Miłość i rzeczy poważne (Love and Other Serious Matters) in 1924. Szaniawski moved to Warsaw during World War II, expelled from the territories annexed by Nazi Germany. He was active in Polish resistance and in 1944 was temporarily arrested by Gestapo.

== Later years and controversy surrounding his death ==
After the war, Szaniawski resided in Kraków for a time, where he wrote his famous play Dwa teatry (Two Theatres) in 1946. It premiered there at the Teatr Żołnierza Polskiego, with set-design by Tadeusz Kantor. Until the end of Stalinism in Poland, it was his most frequently performed play. At 76, Szaniawski married a fine-art painter Anita Szatkowska, who was some twenty years younger and suffering from a mental disorder.

According to witness accounts, Szaniawska (née Szatkowska) starved and abused her husband physically, fed him dissolved plaster as "medicine", and isolated him entirely from the world, until his death in 1970. It is widely assumed that it was she who set his country estate on fire in Zegrzynek in 1977, causing the death of two squatters locked inside. She was taken to a mental hospital in Tworki but escaped. She was apprehended again and placed in a more secure mental ward in Kraków, where she died in 1991. Szaniawski's tumultuous marriage was described in a 2006 play by Remigiusz Grzela entitled Uwaga, złe psy! (Beware of Bad Dogs!), staged by the Teatr Wytwórnia in Warsaw and again by Teatr na Woli in 2008. The play by Grzela was awarded the Kontrapunkt '07 prize and the prize of Polish Radio Wrocław.

== See also ==
- Polish literature
- Zegrze village near Zegrzynek, featuring the Radziwiłł Palace from 1847
- Zegrze Reservoir (Zalew Zegrzyński) nearby, a popular recreation spot for Varsovians
