= Pleograph =

Early form of movie camera

Pleograph (Polish: Pleograf) was an early type of movie camera constructed in 1894, before those made by the Lumière brothers, by Polish inventor Kazimierz Prószyński.

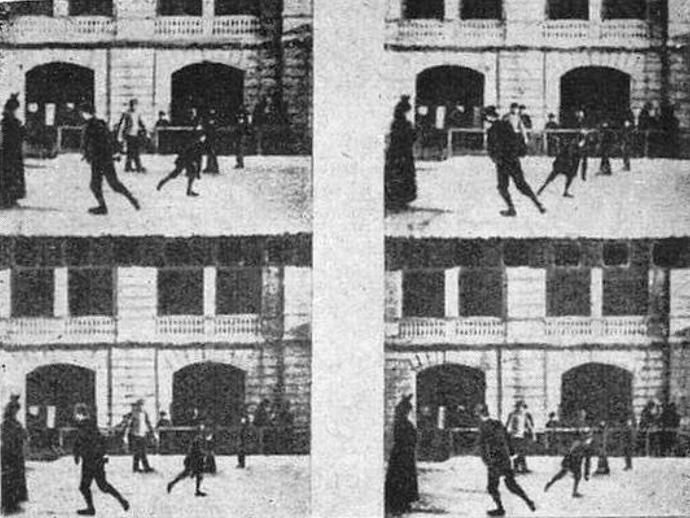
Frames from Rink in Saxon Garden movie shot on Pleograph in 1902

Similarly to the Lumière brothers cinematograph, Prószyński's pleograph has also been used as a projector. The apparatus used a rectangle of celluloid with perforation between several parallel rows of images. Using improved pleograph Prószyński shot first short films showing scenes from the life of Warsaw like people skating on in the park ("Ślizgawka w Ogrodzie Saskim" (Rink in Saxon Garden) - 1902).

Prószyński later constructed the first hand held camera called an Aeroscope, the first compressed air camera.

== Studio named after it ==
The first Polish film studio established in Warsaw in 1901 was named after this camera in its Polish spelling.

== Bibliography ==
- Alfred Liebfeld "Polacy na szlakach techniki" WKŁ, Warszawa 1966
