= Science and technology in Nazi Germany =

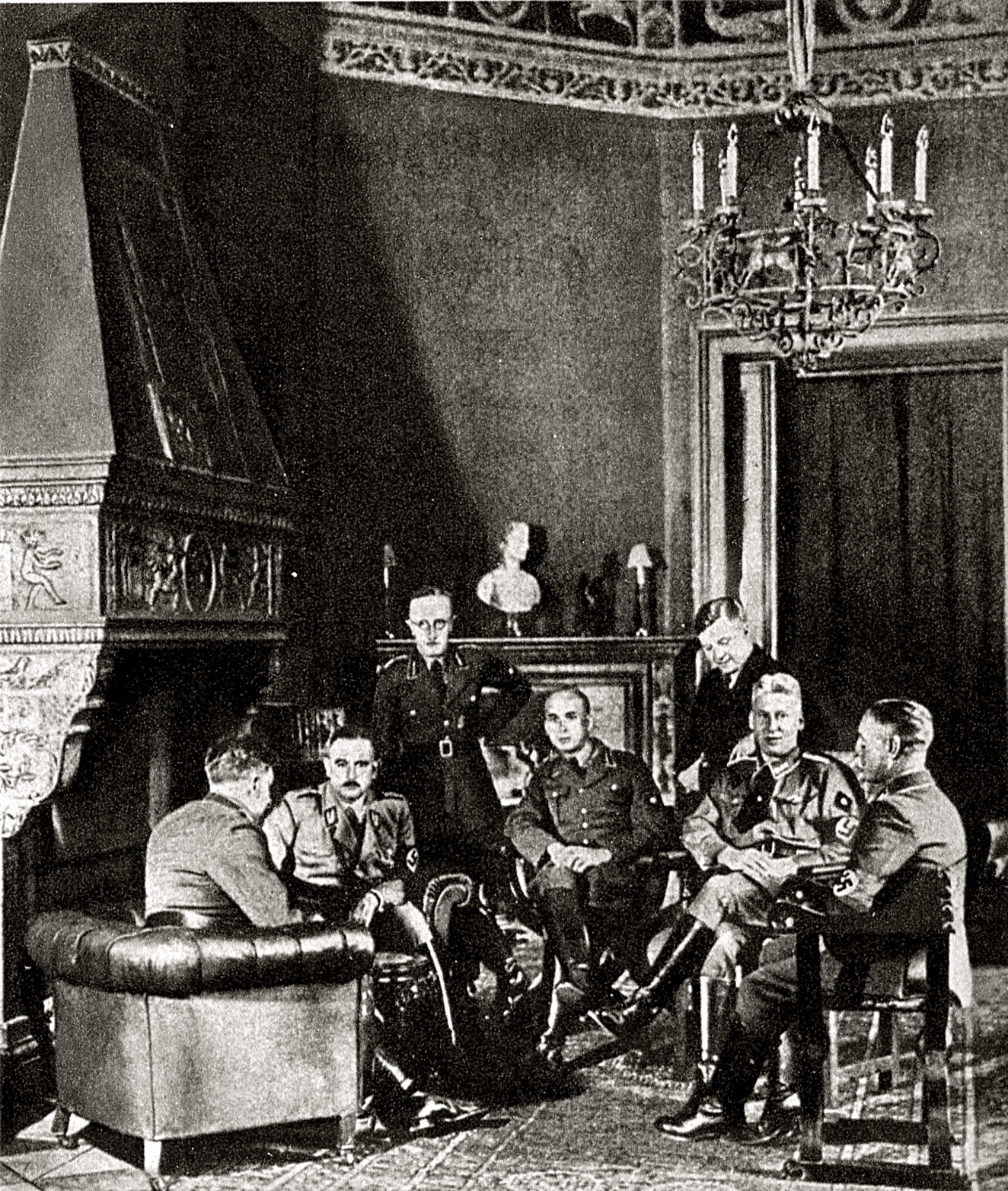
High Administration of Science in Nazi Germany

The abundance of world class technical institutions in Germany combined with generous funding from the Nazi Party resulted in innovations and inventions still used today, including the field of rocketry, more protective helmets for soldiers, gasoline canisters, radio communication, and even Fanta soda. On May 1, 1934, Bernhard Rust was appointed Reichs- und preußischen Minister für Wissenschaft, Erziehung und Volksbildung (Reich Minister of Science, Education and Culture). He was charged with the responsibility of leading science in the spirit of party ideology and preparing for war.

The regime encouraged, mainly, only science that gives an obvious result. The significance of fundamental science was not understood by the leaders of Nazi Germany. After the spectacular victory over France in 1940, Hitler considered his immediate political tasks (see Mein Kampf) completed, and decreed that technical projects for military needs that could not be completed by 1942 should be cancelled.

== Influence of Nazi ideology ==
The theoretical justification for National Socialism is unofficially considered the work of Alfred Rosenberg, author of The Nature, Basic Principles and Goals of the NSDAP (1922) and The Myth of the Twentieth Century (1930). Among many positions, Rosenberg served as head of the Central Research Institute for National Socialist Ideology and Education (1940–1945). Rosenberg graduated from the Moscow Higher Technical School (Bauman Moscow State Technical University) in January 1918 with a diploma of the first degree. Thus he was familiar with the basics of Marxism, but distorted it, suggesting that the entire history of mankind can be explained from the point of view of scientific racism, not class conflict.

The scientific world of Germany retained the mentality characteristic of the previous era, when German science occupied one of the leading places in the world both in the field of theory and its applied sections. Among scientists who valued scientific contacts that allowed for a fruitful exchange of opinions, there was no desire to participate in the development of weapons, inevitably associated with secrecy. At the same time, in addition to the moral rejection of party ideology, they were guided by the fear of becoming dependent on the dictates of an administration ignorant of science, which would inevitably deprive them of their freedom in choosing research topics, and under certain conditions, their personal freedom.

== Pre-war chronicle ==
- 1933 - creation of an electron microscope (authors: Knoll, v.-Borries, Ruska und Bruche), quartz clock (Scheibe und Adelsberger), development of a diesel-electric transmission
- 1934 - the beginning of the industrial production of artificial fiber (Rein), the trial implementation of public broadcasting (Berlin), the construction of a giant ship lift.
- 1935 - introduction of sulfamides into medical therapeutic practice.
- 1936 - the invention of the nerve agent tabun, the beginning of the production of synthetic rubber (Buna concern), the development of technology for the beneficiation of iron ore, the development of technology for the manufacture of multi-layer chromogenic photography (Rudolf Fischer), experiments with the development of sound color cinema, a telecast by telephone (Leipzig-Berlin ), the creation of a research and testing rocket center in Peenemünde.
- 1937 - invention of artificial fiber perlon (Schlack), start of archaeological excavations at Olympia, Greece.
- 1938 - a major exhibition of television technology (Berlin), Professor Otto Hahn, using chemical methods, discovers the phenomenon of the decay of the atomic nucleus.
- On December 17, 1938, Otto Hahn and his assistant Fritz Strassmann discovered and proved the fission of the uranium nucleus in Berlin, which became the scientific and technical basis for the use of nuclear energy.
- 1939 - the invention of the military nerve agent sarin (Schrader, Ritter, Linde und Ambros), the invention of the insecticide DDT (Schrader and P. G. Muller), the development of artificial fat manufacturing technology (Reppe), the beginning of work on the use of nuclear energy, the beginning work on radar technology, the first flights of aircraft with jet engines Heinkel He 176 and Heinkel He 178 (24 Aug.)
- 1940 - creation of organosilicon materials (R. Müller).
- Manfred von Ardenne created an electron microscope with a magnification of 500,000 times.
- I.G. Farbenindustrie AG sold a patent for the production of artificial rubber from oil refinery products (Buna N and Buna S patents) to the American company Standard Oil, which allowed the United States to ensure the production of artificial rubber in a short time and meet its needs in the future, when Japan seized plantations in Asia rubber plant.

=== Artillery ===
The German 8.8 cm Flak 18/36/37/41 (1941), with a muzzle velocity of 1000 m / s, better known as "acht und acht" in its variants Flak 18, Flak 36, Flak 37 and Flak 41 was an unsurpassed achievement for that time artillery technology. Along with the fact that she drove enemy aircraft to high altitudes, she became an excellent anti-tank weapon, one of the few at the beginning of the war capable of shooting Soviet T-34 and KV-1 tanks, British Matilda II, French tanks with a direct shot at a distance of 1 km. B-1. In the summer of 1944, the Wehrmacht had 40,000 of these guns in service. In October 1944 alone, 3.1 million shells were fired from these guns. The competitor of this gun (manufactured by Rheinmetall) was the 8.8-cm-PAK 43 and 8.8-cm-PAK 43/41 gun, specially developed in 1943 for anti-tank defense by Krupp.

=== Missile technology ===
"Not a single private person or state institution could afford to spend millions of marks on the creation of large rockets, if this were limited solely to the interests of pure science. Before us, humanity, willing to pay any costs, the task was set to solve a great goal and to do in this regard the first practical step, and we opened the door to the future… — Walter Dornberger

== By discipline ==
=== Mathematics ===
At the rise of Nazi Germany in 1933, "non-Aryan" scientists and academics were dismissed from their positions. This resulted in the quick dismissal of Richard Courant, Emmy Noether, Felix Bernstein, Paul Bernays, and Hans Lewy were all fired from the Mathematical Institute in Göttingen that April. As a result, Saunders Mac Lane had written to his mother that "So many professors and instructors have been fired or have left that the mathematics department is pretty thoroughly emasculated". The destruction of mathematicians in Göttingen has become a tale of folklore.

=== Medicine ===
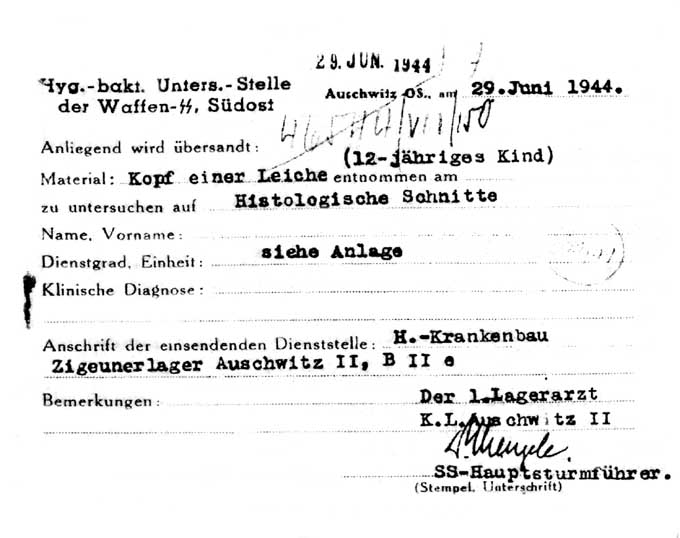
A request in which Dr. Josef Mengele demands that the head of a 12-year-old child be provided to him for "examination". From the archive of the gypsy sector of the Auschwitz camp

During the war years, German doctors conducted experiments in concentration camps that were incompatible with medical and human ethics, including determining the limits of the viability of the human body. On November 9, 1946, after the trial of the main war criminals, the Nuremberg Doctors' trial (Ärzteprozess) began. During the process, 1,471 documents were considered, and witnesses for the prosecution and defense were heard. The testimonies of the accused were published in a large edition in two volumes: Wissenschaft ohne Menschlichkeit and Diktat der Menschenverachtung, but these materials did not go on open sale.

=== Social sciences ===
A large number of social scientists were purged after the Nazis took power due to the Jewish ancestry or "political unreliability" of the academics. They included prominent social scientists such as Karl Mannheim, Max Horkheimer, Hugo Sinzheimer, Emil Lederer, and Albert Salomon. Renowned scholars such as Paul Tillich, Alfred Weber, and Paul Honigsheim resigned in protest to the purge.

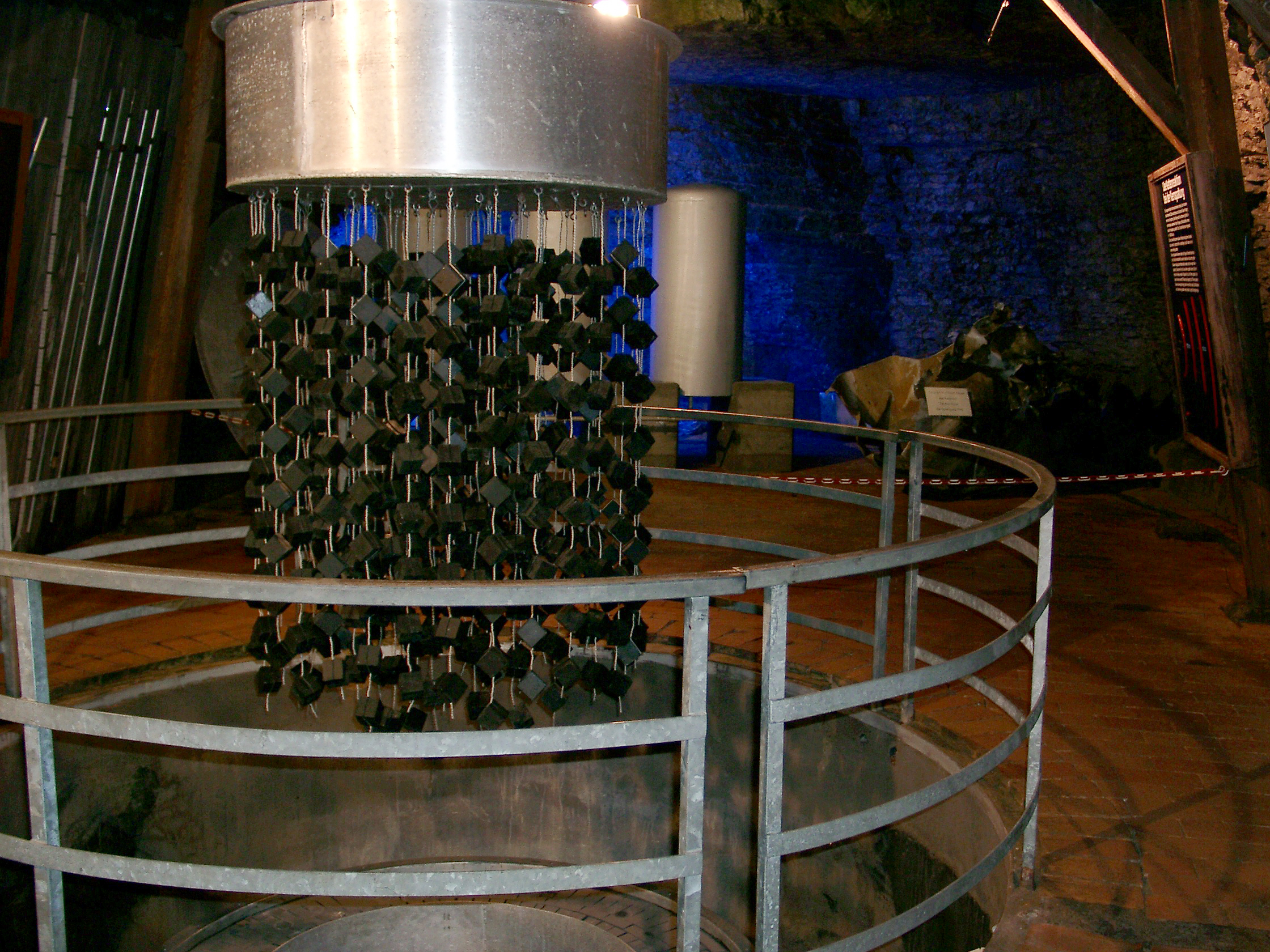
Haigerloch. Model of the filling of a nuclear boiler

== Literature ==
- Heinz Bergschicker, Deutsche Chronik 1933—1945. Ein Zeitbild Faschistischen Diktatur. 3.Auflage. Berlin: Verlag der Nation, 1981.
- Boris Rauschenbach, Hermann Oberth 1894—1989. Dr.Böttiger Verlags-GmbH, Wiesbaden. 1995 ISBN 3-925725-23-7.
- Славин, Сергей Николаевич Секретное оружие Третьего Рейха.- М.: Вече, 1999 — 448 с. («Военные тайны XX века»). ISBN 5-7838-0543-2.
- Тиссен П. Расцвет и упадок германской науки в период Второй мировой войны. В кн.: Итоги второй мировой войны. М.: Издательство иностранной литературы, 1957. Стр. 335—355
