= Zegrze Reservoir =

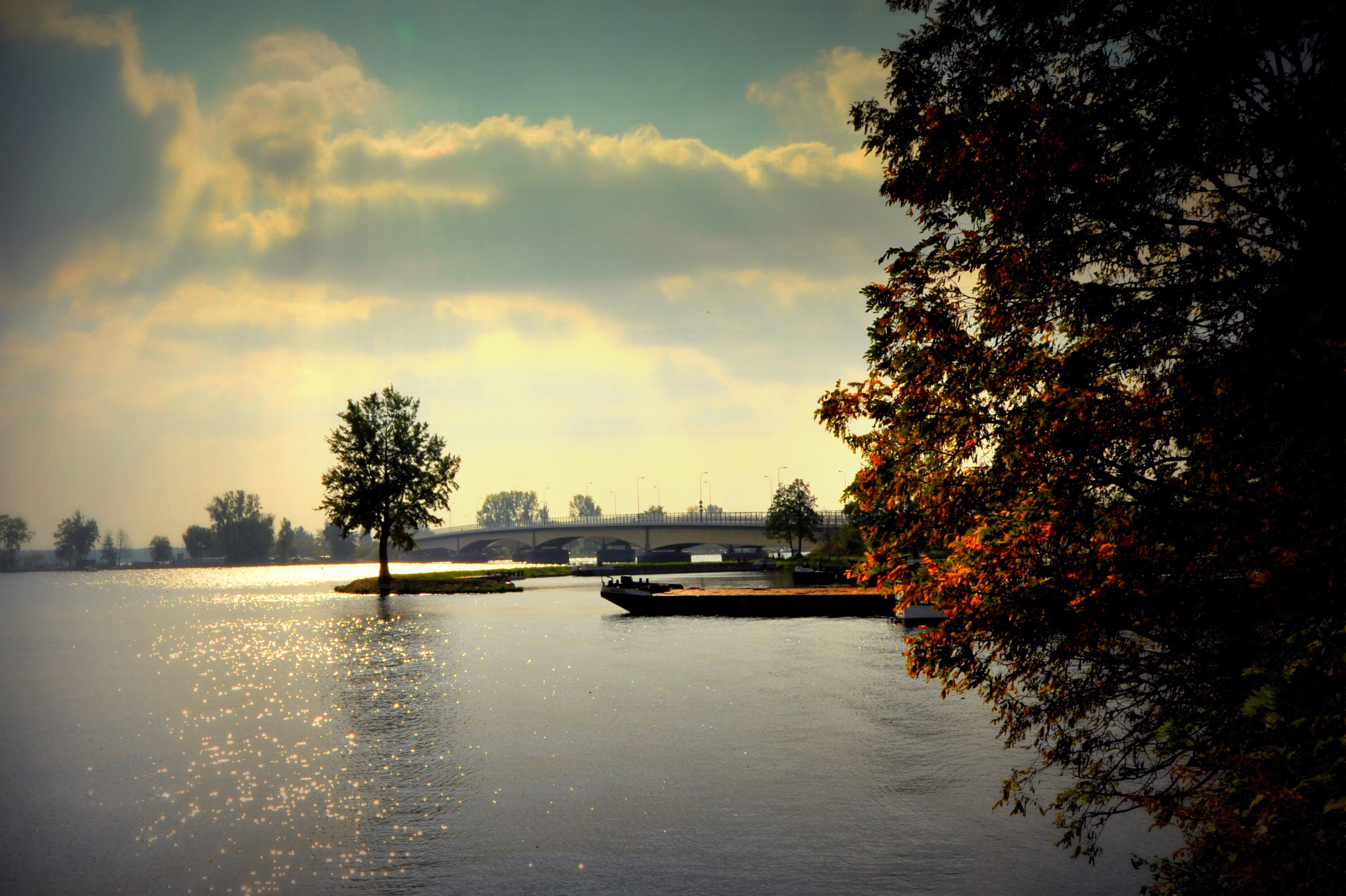

- Location within Poland
- Location: North of Warsaw
- Coordinates: 52°29′12″N 21°01′18″E
- Type: reservoir
- Primary inflows: Narew, Bug
- Primary outflows: Narew
- Basin countries: Poland
- Surface area: 33 km^{2} (13 sq mi)
- Settlements: Warsaw

The Zegrze Reservoir (or Zegrze Lake, in Polish officially Jezioro Zegrzyńskie, unofficially Zalew Zegrzyński) is a man-made reservoir in Poland, located just north of Warsaw, on the lower course of the Narew river. It is formed by a dam constructed in 1963 with a hydroelectric complex producing 20 megawatts of power. The surface area of the reservoir is about 33 km². The name originates from the nearby Zegrze village, featuring the historic Radziwiłł Palace (Pałac Zegrzyński) built in 1847 by the noble Krasiński family.

== See also ==
- Zegrzynek, birthplace of Jerzy Szaniawski nearby
