= Zegrze =

- Village
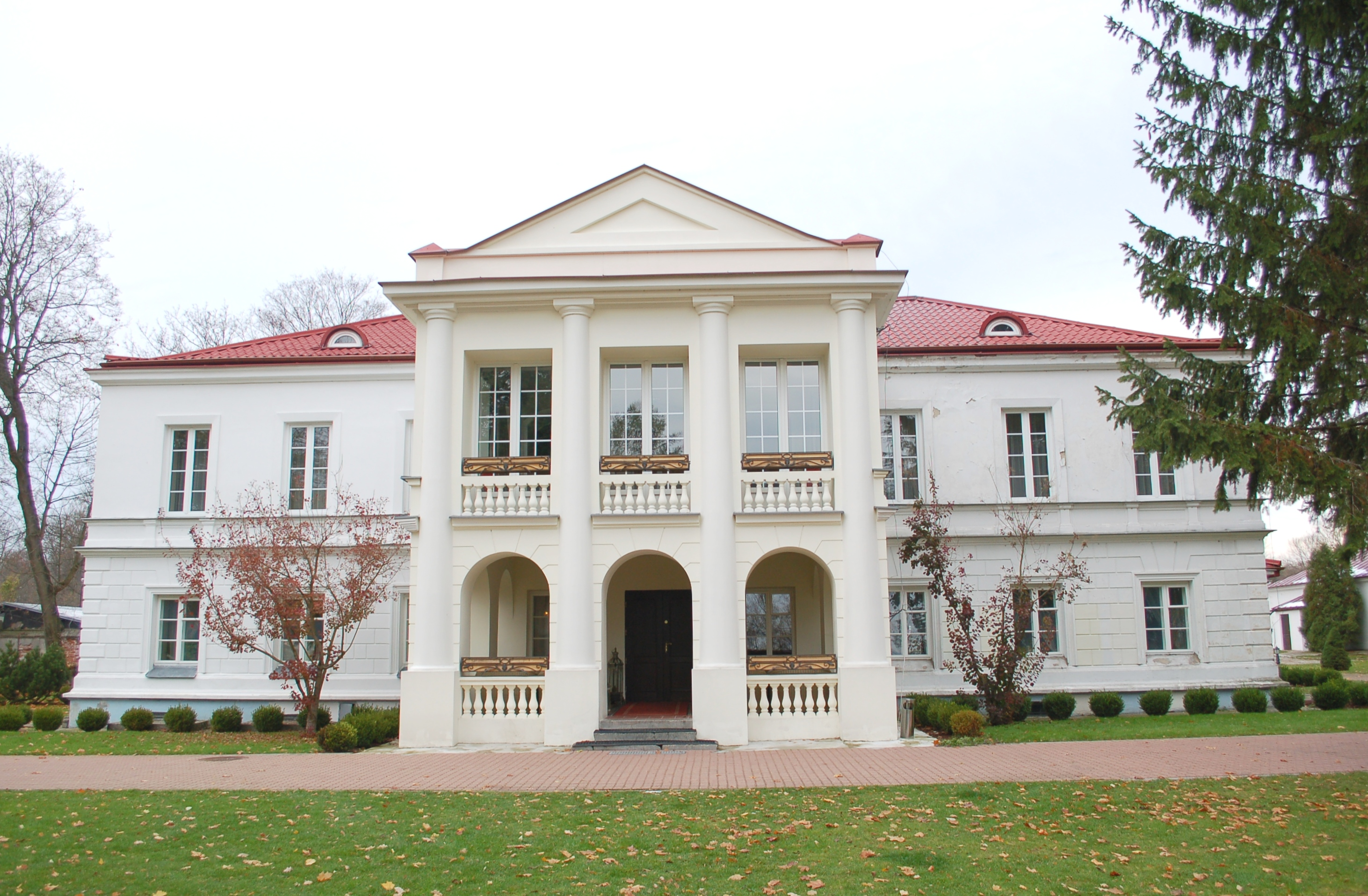
- Radziwiłł Palace

- Location within Poland
- Coordinates: 52°27′43″N 21°2′4″E
- Country: Poland
- Voivodeship: Masovian
- County: Legionowo
- Gmina: Serock
- Population: 1,110 (2,011)

Zegrze [ˈzɛɡʐɛ] is a village in the administrative district of Gmina Serock, within Legionowo County, Masovian Voivodeship, in east-central Poland.

The village gave its name to the nearby Zegrze Reservoir, a man-made lake constructed in 1963, on the lower course of the Narew river, with a hydroelectric complex producing 20 Megawatts of power, a popular place of recreation for the residents of Warsaw.

is the location of a historic palace built in 1847 by the noble Krasiński family, given as a dowry of Jadwiga Krasińska in 1862, to her new husband Prince Maciej Radziwiłł. The palace, surrounded by a park, serves as a convention centre and a small hotel.

== See also ==
- Zegrzynek, birthplace of Jerzy Szaniawski nearby
