= Chromogen =

Chemical compound that can be converted into a dye or pigment

In chemistry, the term chromogen refers to a colourless (or faintly coloured) chemical compound that can be converted by chemical reaction into a compound which can be described as "coloured" (a chromophore). There is no universally agreed definition of the term. Various dictionaries give the following definitions:

- A substance capable of conversion into a pigment or dye.
- Any substance that can become a pigment or coloring matter, a substance in organic fluids that forms colored compounds when oxidized, or a compound, not itself a dye, that can become a dye.
- Any substance, itself without color, giving origin to a coloring matter.

In biochemistry the term has a rather different meaning. The following are found in various dictionaries.

- A precursor of a biochemical pigment
- A pigment-producing microorganism
- Any of certain bacteria that produce a pigment
- A strongly pigmented or pigment-generating organelle, organ, or microorganism.

== Applications in chemistry ==
- In chromogenic photography, film or paper contains one or many layers of silver halide (AgX) emulsion, along with dye couplers that, in combination with processing chemistry, form visible dyes.

== Applications in biochemistry and medicine ==
- The Runyon classification classifies mycobacteria by chromogenic properties.
