= Kazimierz Prószyński =

Polish inventor (1875–1945)

Kazimierz Prószynski
- Prószyński, c. 1895
- Born: 4 April 1875; Warsaw, Congress Poland, Russian Empire
- Died: 19 March 1945 (aged 69); Mauthausen, German Reich
- Occupations: Inventor; film director
- Known for: Invention of the Pleograph and the Aeroscope

Signature
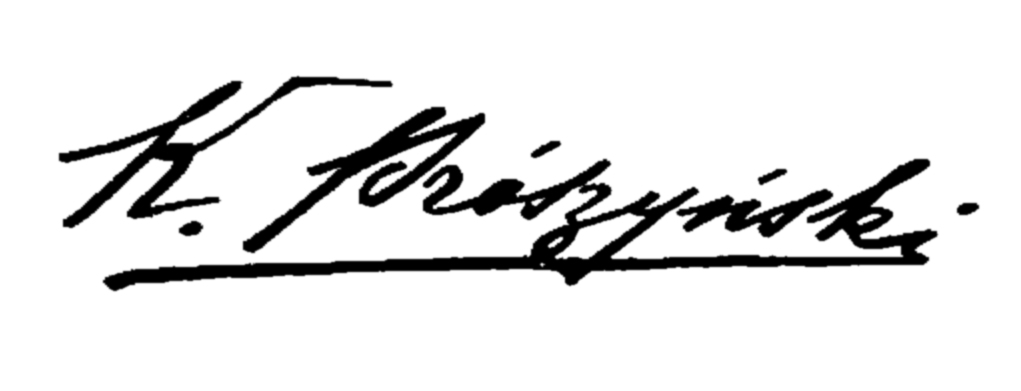

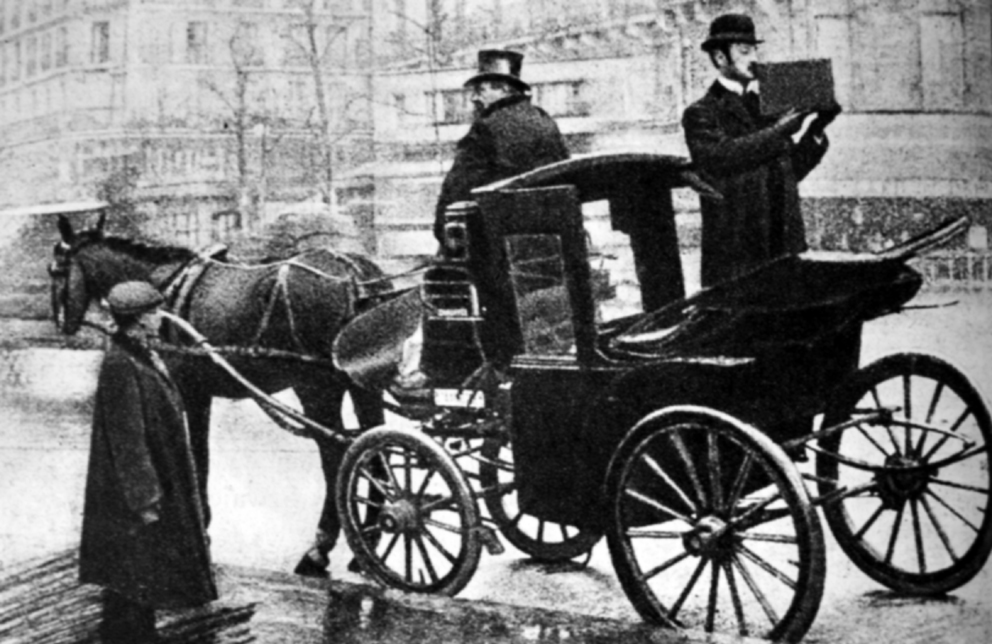
Prószyński filming the streets of Paris in 1909 with his Aeroscope

Kazimierz Prószyński (4 April 1875 – 19 March 1945) was a Polish inventor active in the field of cinematography. He patented his first film camera, called Pleograph, before the Lumière brothers, and later went on to improve the cinema projector for Gaumont. He was also the inventor of the widely used first hand-held Aeroscope camera.

== Biography ==
Born in Warsaw, Prószyński was educated in both Poland and Belgium, and was also active in France, England and the United States. He was the grandson of the photographer Stanisław Antoni Prószyński, who had been accused and sentenced by Congress Poland's Imperial Russian authorities of placing Polish patriotic symbols in the background of photographs. He was also the son of Konrad Prószyński, an active Polish educator, writer and publisher.

In 1894, Kazimierz Prószyński built one of the first movie cameras. This Pleograph, or apparatus for taking photographs and projecting pictures, was built before the Lumière brothers lodged their patent. Prószyński also produced several films in Poland at the beginning of the 20th century as well as creating an improved film projector shutter, the first hand held film camera and devised a method of synchronizing sound and film tracks.

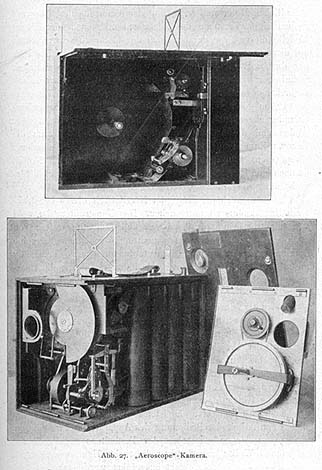
Aeroscope invention of Prószyński 1909.

Kazimierz Prószyński spent a large part of his active life abroad. At the beginning of the 20th century, he was active in France and England as an inventor and producer of the Aeroscope (1909) camera, powered by compressed air. Filming with Aeroscope the cameraman did not have to turn the crank, as in all cameras of that time, so he had both hands on the camera to operate. This made it possible to film with a hand-held camera in most difficult circumstances and from airplanes. Compressed air was pumped into the camera system, before filming, with a simple special pump similar to the ones still used to pump bicycle tires. Hundreds of light and relatively compact Aeroscope cameras were used by British Army combat cameramen on the battlefields of World War I and later by newsreel cameramen until the late 1920s, when more modern spring cameras like Eyemo and later Bolex took over. Still, there are archival photographs of Aeroscope cameras being pumped by British combat cameramen as late as in 1940, at the beginning of World War II.

As soon as Poland regained its independence in November 1918, Prószyński returned with his English wife, Dorothy, and children Kazimierz junior and Irena. From the start it was difficult to find business partners for his invention. In 1922, he managed to establish a company Oko (Polish for: eye) to promote a simple amateur camera of his construction with the same name, which Prószyński intended to mass-produce for schools and the public. The economic crisis of the 1920s interrupted Kazimierz Prószyński's plans. He was busy with other inventions, such as simple home film projectors and reading machines for the blind, but did not manage to mass-produce any of them.

During World War II and the German occupation of Poland, German Gestapo police discovered his workshop. They arrested Prószyński and his co-worker under the accusation of conspiracy. Released after 10 days, Prószyński did not manage to remove all suspicion. He was chased by Gestapo and had to move often to avoid arrest. On 25 August 1944, during the Warsaw Uprising, he was arrested.

Kazimierz Prószyński died in the German concentration camp KZ Mauthausen in spring of 1945, as the prisoner number 129957, shortly before liberation.

Kazimierz Prószyński is regarded along with Bolesław Matuszewski and Jan Szczepanik as one of the most important pioneers of Polish cinema and cinematography.

== See also ==
- List of Poles
- Timeline of Polish science and technology
