= Zegrzynek =

- Village
- Location within Poland
- Coordinates: 52°28′28″N 21°3′15″E
- Country: Poland
- Voivodeship: Masovian
- County: Legionowo
- Gmina: Serock
- Population: 4

Zegrzynek [zɛˈɡʐɨnɛk] is a village in the administrative district of Gmina Serock, within Legionowo County, Masovian Voivodeship, in east-central Poland.

The village is a birthplace of playwright Jerzy Szaniawski, member of the Polish Academy of Literature in interwar Poland and author of popular stories about Professor Tutka published in daily press in postwar Poland. His parents owned an estate in Zegrzynek (practically the entire settlement), with the manor visited by writers such as Maria Konopnicka and Konrad Prószyński. It was nationalized by the communists after the war. It is widely assumed that it was Jerzy's wife, Anita Szaniawska (née Szatkowska) who set Szaniawskis country manor on fire in 1977, causing not only its total destruction, but also the death of two squatters locked inside. She died in a mental hospital.

== See also ==
- Zegrze village nearby, with the Radziwiłł Palace
- Zegrze Reservoir (Zalew Zegrzyński), a popular recreation spot for Varsovians
