= Aeroscope =

Film camera

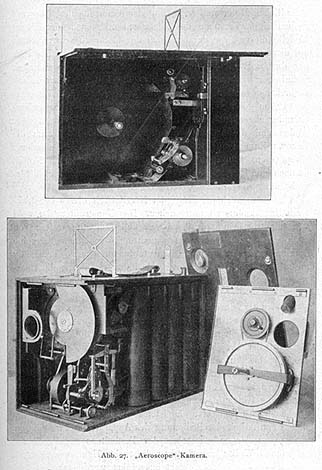
Aeroscope (1910)

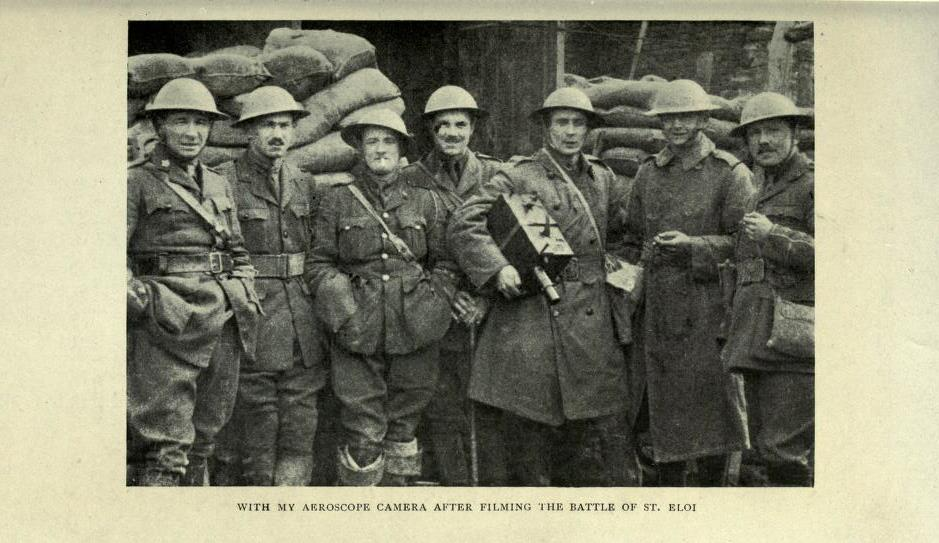
Geoffrey Malins with aeroscope camera during World War I

Aeroscope, from Ancient Greek ἀήρ (aḗr), meaning "air", and σκοπέω (skopéō), meaning "to look", was a type of compressed air camera for making films, constructed by Polish inventor Kazimierz Prószyński in 1909 (French patent from 10 April 1909) and built in England since 1911, at first by Newman & Sinclair, and from 1912 by Cherry Kearton Limited.

== Background ==
Patented in England in 1910 by the Polish inventor Kazimierz Prószyński, Aeroscope was the first successful hand-held operated film camera. It was powered by compressed air pumped before filming into the camera with a hand pump similar to a bicycle pump. A crank was not needed to advance the loaded film unlike other cameras of the time. The camera could then be operated with both hands: holding the camera and controlling the focus. This made it possible to film with the Aeroscope hand-held in difficult field circumstances, from airplanes, and for military purposes. The Aeroscope carried 400 feet (120 m) of 35mm film and, once pressurised, could work with no further pumping for up to 10 minutes. The Aeroscope was known for its simplicity and reliability.

== Popularity ==
Hundreds of light and relatively compact Aeroscope cameras were used by the British War Office for the combat cameramen on the battlefields of World War I, and by all newsreel cameramen all over world, until the late 1920s. Aeroscope has been used among others by Arthur Herbert Malins recognized by Kelly (1997, Page 60) as “the most famous of the war cinematographers” who used it at the battle of the Somme. As several of the cameramen died filming from the firing lines Aeroscope got a name of camera of death.

In 1928 Prószyński built an improved version of his camera, with an air pressure meter, but the more practical spring cameras like Eyemo and later Bolex took over. However, even by the beginning of World War II, some of the improved Aeroscope cameras were in use by the British combat cameramen.

== See also ==
- Eyemo
- Konvas
- Filmo
- Debrie Parvo
