= Konvas =

35mm motion-picture cameras

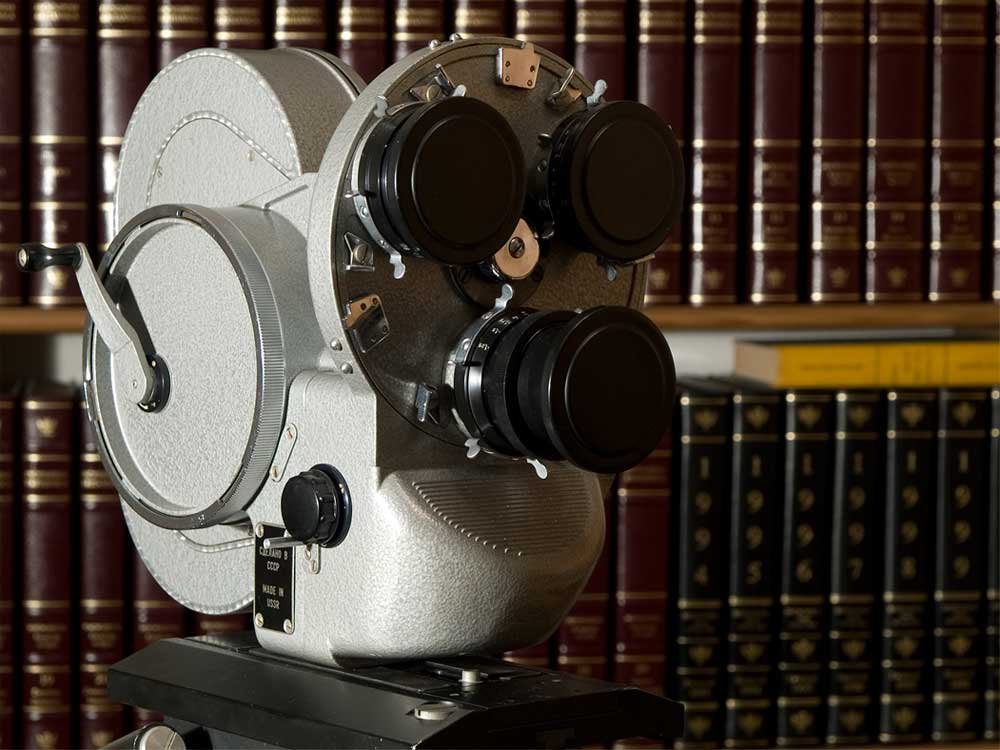
1967 make Konvas-1M made by KMZ with hand crank attachment

The Konvas pull-down (claw) mechanism is remained the same for all modifications.

Konvas (Russian: Конвас) is the general name of portable 35mm motion-picture cameras that was manufactured in the USSR by KMZ (KRASNOGORSKIY MEKHANICHESKIY ZAVOD – Krasnogorsk Mechanical Works), known as ZENIT camera makers, and later on, MOSKINAP (MOSKOVSKIY ZAVOD KINOAPPARATURIY – Moscow Works of Cinema Equipment (The holder of the Order of the Badge of Honour – Орден «Знак Почета»), at one time in the late 80's had over 2,000 employees; now OAO "MOSKINAP", and for a short period at the same factory after the collapse of the Soviet Union. The factory was manufacturing Laser soundheads, and 35mm sound projectors originally were made by Odessa PO KINAP some time ago. The camera line is no longer made, although many working models are still circulating at reasonable prices worldwide. The name "Konvas" is a portmanteau that comes from the first three letters of the last and first name of the camera's designer, KONSTANTINOV VASILY (Russian: Константинов Василий).

Later renamed to Konvas-Avtomat (Automatic) for electric-driven models.

Initially, the camera was used widely by fiction, documentary, and news cameramen throughout the Soviet Union and Eastern Europe. The relatively small size of Konvas cameras and its low price (it often sells for almost the same price as the more primitive, older Bell & Howell Eyemo) makes it popular with independent filmmakers throughout the world to this day. Modifications for these cameras can still be made to this day.

Konvas cameras are reflex, using a spinning mirrored shutter, allowing the operator to view the scene through the main lens during filming. Because of the camera's movement mechanism, the shutter opening is 155° as opposed to the 180° which is standard on many other cameras. Consequently, the shutter speed is slightly higher, for which the exposure must be compensated from the usual 24fps frames per second light meter setting by 1/3 of an f/stop. It has an extended dwell time for film transport like in ARRI 35 series, thus provides more steadiness despite it has no register pin. Some models including −2M and 8M accept a single OCT-19 mount lens, others have a three lens turret including −1M and 7M.

All Konvas cameras accept a 60-meter (slightly less than 200 ft) load of film via a detachable camera magazine, some also accept a 120-meter (roughly 400 ft) detachable magazine. The magazines are very easy to change, however; they are not easy to load and often present a challenge for camera assistants not familiar with the Konvas magazine.

The Konvas runs on an electric 12 Volt DC motor mainly. Some are capable of running at very accurate "X-tal Sync" speeds @ 8, 12, 16, 24, 25, 32fps via 17EP-16 APK, 18EP-16 APK and 19EP-16APK motor drives while 15EPSS motor drive provides electric regulated speeds. The camera is noisy (about 55dB), making sound recording difficult, so it can be used as a MOS camera. This was not a problem in the Soviet Union, as Soviet cinema usually re-recorded all sound during editing via a process called "ADR" or "dubbing/looping".
