= Konrad Prószyński =

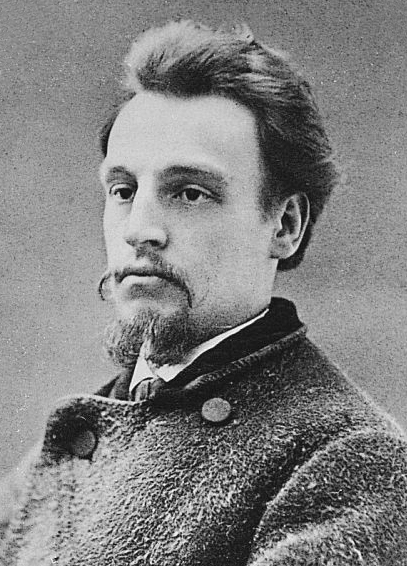
- Born: 19 February 1851; Mińsk Litewski, now Minsk
- Died: 8 July 1908 (aged 57); Warsaw
- Resting place: Powązki Cemetery
- Writing career
- Pen name: Kazimierz Promyk
- Notable works: Pictorial literacy; O księdzu Stanisławie Staszycu

Konrad Prószyński (19 February 1851 – 8 July 1908), pen name Kazimierz Promyk, was a Polish writer and editor from the Russian Empire. He was the author of primers (textbooks), editor-in-chief of Gazeta Świąteczna (Holiday Gazette); the founder of secret Society for National Education (Towarzystwo Oświaty Narodowej) under foreign Partitions, and the author of well received Pictorial Literacy (1879) primer. He was father of a Polish inventor Kazimierz Prószyński.

== Career ==
Prószyński began teaching at the age of 23. In the summer of 1874 he set up a study course for illiterate adults around Kałuszyn and Mrozów villages in Masovia. In 1875, he published his first folding poster to be used by students as the on-the-wall primer. It was his first great publishing success, printed in 5,000 copies and sold out in less than a month. It was reprinted again, this time with 15,000 copies in country-wide circulation. He signed his publications with a literary pseudonym Promyk (a ray of light).

Due to broad popularity of his first educational poster, towards the end of 1875 Prószyński wrote the first of his three most important works: Primer, Where You Learn to Read in 5 or 8 Weeks (Elementarz, na którym nauczysz czytać w 5 albo 8 tygodni, 1875); printed in more than a million copies in the next 33 years. It has been described as the first modern elementary primer. Also in 1875, he wrote O księdzu Stanisławie Staszycu (On Father Stanisław Staszic) whose experience inspired him; as well as his next educational volume: "Pierwsza książeczka dla wprawy w czytaniu" (First Book for Practice in Reading, 1875). On top of that, on May 1, 1875 along with two friends and co-conspirators, Prószyński signed a founding act of the highly secretive Towarzystwo Oświaty Narodowej (Society for National Education).

His publications became a financial downpour for his publisher, but not for Prószyński who received little royalty. He decided to print and distribute his works by himself. In 1878 he formally registered his own publishing company called Konrad Prószyński National Bookstore (Księgarnia Krajowa Konrada Prószyńskiego). This step turned into the journey of a lifetime combining a publishing venue with a mail-order service.

=== Broad recognition ===
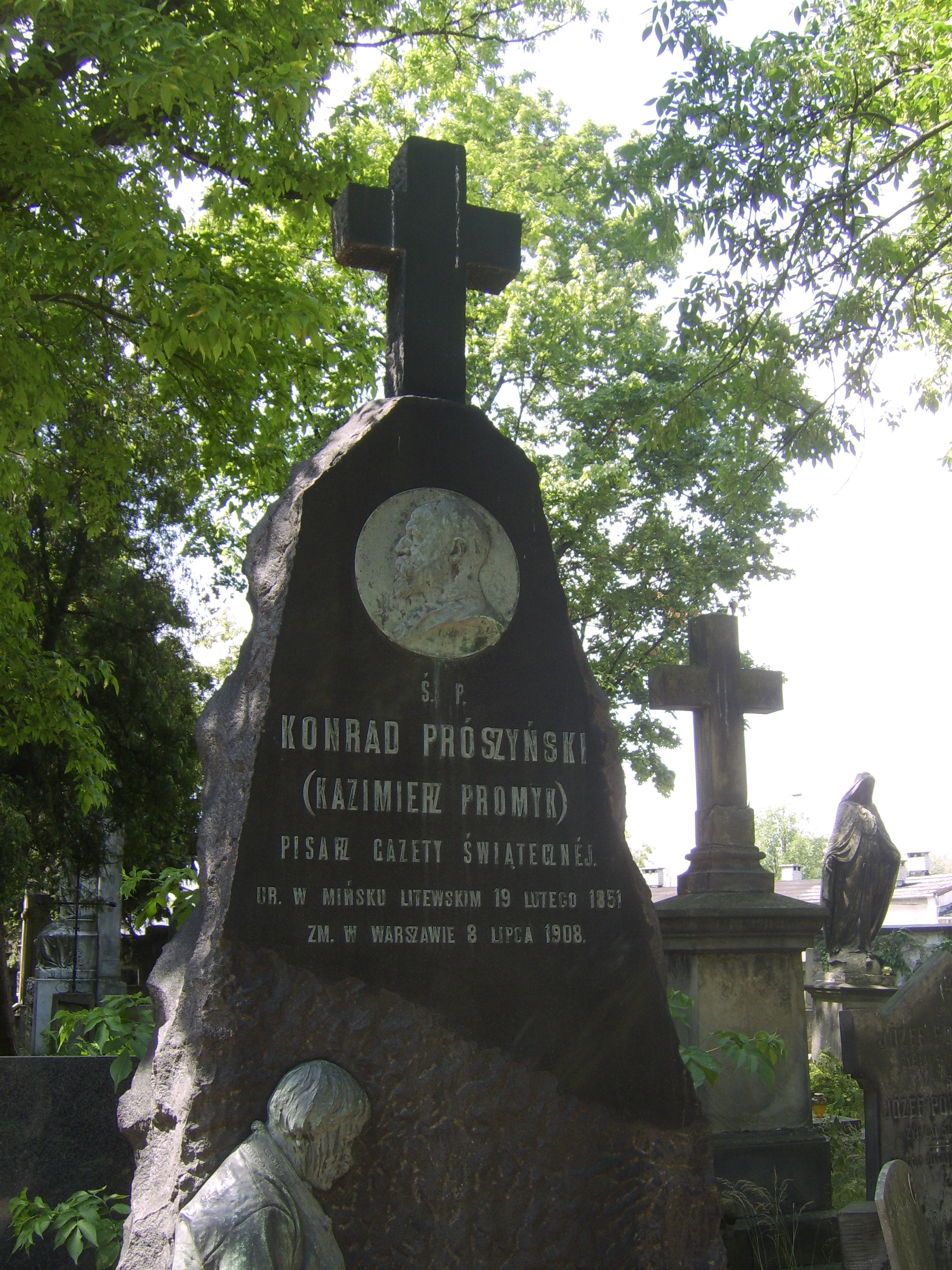
Grave at the Powązki Cemetery

Prószyński wrote and self-published the next versions of his primer, as well as new textbooks for self-education and self-directed learning, including The Pictorial Book for Reading and Writing (Obrazowa nauka czytania i pisania, 1879). The book was sent to England in 1893 for an exhibition organized by the British scientific society (the 1893 International Exhibition by the Pedagogical Society of London). There, it won the first prize in its own category, as the best primer in the world.

In 1880 Prószyński applied to the Tsarist authorities for a permit to publish a Polish-language weekly. His Holiday Gazette (Gazeta Świąteczna) first appeared in January 1881. He published it alone, although he was denied the more formal role of its editor-in-chief. He distributed it via regular mail by subscription. The gazette was one of his longest-lasting endeavours, held for the next 28 years, until the end of his life. It was under constant attack by Russian censorship. Thanks to prior contacts established for the distribution of primers, the Gazette was sent as far as North and South America, as well as Africa and Asia. Those foreign editions often carried articles that were censored in the Polish edition. Prószyński died in 1908, three years after the Polish Revolution of 1905. He was buried at the Powązki Cemetery in Warsaw. His tombstone is adorned with the sculpture by Czesław Makowski. The Holiday Gazette (Holiday Newspaper) kept on publishing thanks to his family until September 1939.
