= Maciej Radziwiłł =

Polish–Lithuanian noble and composer (1749–1800)

His Serene Highness Prince Maciej Radziwiłł
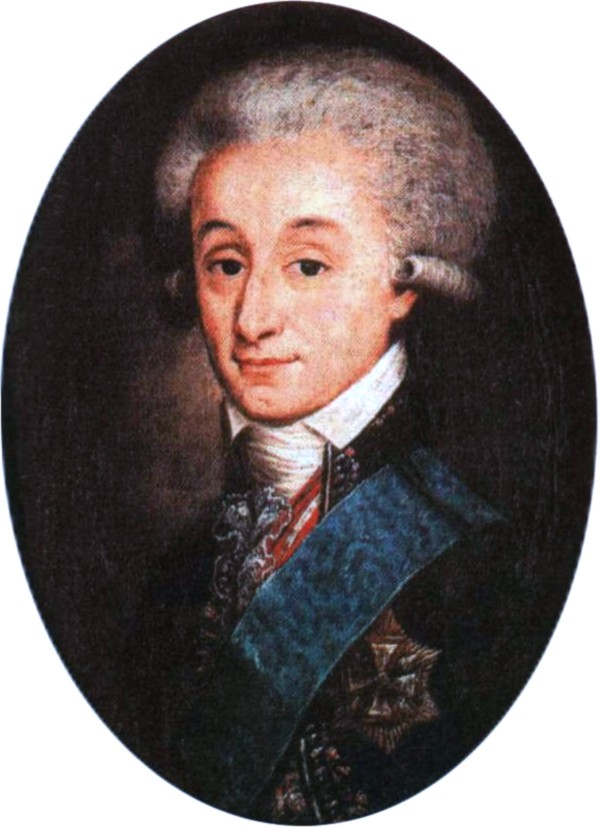

- Coat of arms: Trąby
- Born: 10 November 1749; Warsaw
- Died: 2 September 1800 (aged 50); Szydłowiec
- Family: Radziwiłł
- Consort: Elżbieta Chodkiewicz
- Issue: Antonina Radziwiłł; Konstanty Radziwiłł
- Father: Leon Michał Radziwiłł
- Mother: Anna Luiza Mycielska

Prince Maciej Radziwiłł (Lithuanian: Motiejus Radvila; 10 November 1749 – 2 September 1800) was a Polish–Lithuanian noble (szlachcic), composer and librettist.

== Biography ==
Around 1780, Maciej (Matthias) lived at Nieśwież in the Minsk region, the house of Karol Radziwiłł, voivode of Vilnius, who maintained a company of actors, musicians and dancers there and at his estates in Alba (near Nieśwież), Ołyka, Słuck, Biała Podlaska and elsewhere. While at Nieśwież, Radziwiłł wrote the libretto for Jan Dawid Holland's opera Agatka, czyli Przyjazd pana (‘Agatha, or The Master's Arrival’) which was performed on 17 September 1784 during King Stanisław August's visit to Nieśwież. He also wrote the libretto and composed the music for the three-act opera Wójt osady albiańskiej (‘The Headman of the Settlers at Alba’) which premiered in Alba on 4 November 1786.

Radziwiłł was owner of Szydłowiec, Grand Podkomorzy of Lithuania since 1786, and castellan of Vilnius since 1788. He moved to Vilnius where he composed some instrumental and orchestral music and was awarded with the Order of the White Eagle on February 18, 1788.

== Sources ==
- Alina Nowak-Romanowicz: "Prince Maciej Radziwiłł", Grove Music Online ed. L. Macy (Accessed September 20, 2008), (subscription access)
