= Hand-held camera =

Filmmaking technique

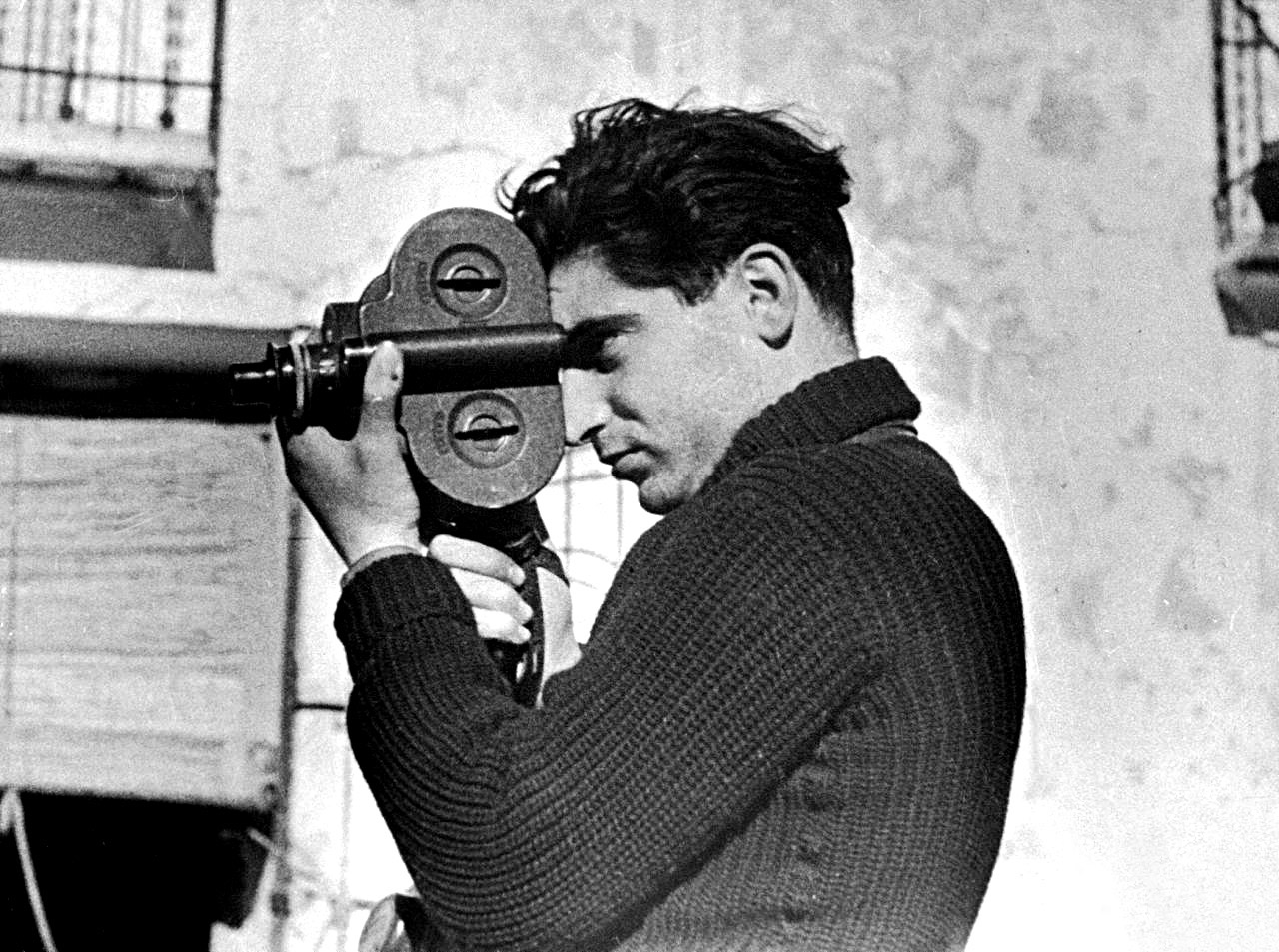
Robert Capa in Spain using a Filmo 16 mm film camera in 1937

Hand-held camera or hand-held shooting is a filmmaking and video production technique in which a camera is held in the camera operator's hands as opposed to being mounted on a tripod or other base. Hand-held cameras are used because they are conveniently sized for travel and because they allow greater freedom of motion during filming. Newsreel camera operators frequently gathered images using a hand-held camera. Virtually all modern video cameras are small enough for hand-held use, but many professional video cameras are designed specifically for hand-held use such as for electronic news-gathering (ENG), and electronic field production (EFP).

Hand-held camera shots often result in a shaky image, unlike the stable image from a tripod-mounted camera. Purposeful use of this technique is called shaky camera and can be heightened by the camera operator during filming, or artificially simulated in post-production. To prevent shaky shots, a number of image stabilization technologies have been used on hand-held cameras including optical, digital and mechanical methods. The Steadicam, which is not considered to be a "hand-held" camera, uses a stabilizing mount to make smoother shots.

== Early usage ==
=== Silent film ===
The first silent film era movie cameras that could be carried by the cameraman were bulky and not very practical to simultaneously support, aim, and crank by hand, yet they were sometimes used in that way by pioneering filmmakers. In the 1890s, brothers Auguste and Louis Lumière developed the fairly compact Cinematograph which could be mounted on a tripod or carried by the cameraman, and it also served as the film projector. In 1908 with a hand-held Lumière camera, Wilbur Wright was filmed flying his aircraft on the outskirts of Paris. Thomas Edison developed a portable film camera in 1896. Polish inventor Kazimierz Prószyński first demonstrated a hand-held film camera in 1898 but it was not reliable.

From 1909 to 1911, directors Francesco Bertolini and Adolfo Padavan, with assistant director Giuseppe de Liguoro, shot scenes for L'Inferno, based on Dante's The Divine Comedy. The film was first shown in 1911 and it included hand-held camera shots as well as innovative camera angles and special film effects. In 1915, Thomas H. Ince's The Italian, directed by Reginald Barker, included two hand-held shots, at least one of which represented the viewpoint of a character. The camera swerved suddenly to match what was happening to the character in the story.

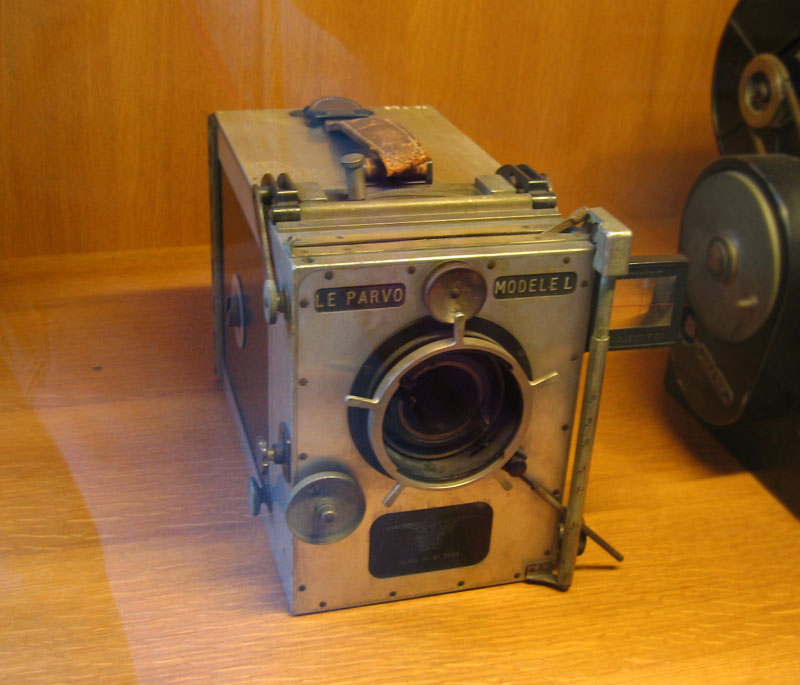
A Parvo Model L camera

The compact hand-cranked Parvo camera was first made in Paris by André Debrie in 1908. Though expensive, it slowly built in popularity from about 1915. By the mid-1920s it was, in sheer numbers, the most-used film camera of any kind.

The problem of hand-cranking and supporting the camera, and simultaneously aiming and focusing it, was difficult to solve. A variety of automatic cranking systems were developed to free one of the cameraman's hands. Various cameras were invented which replaced the hand crank with an electric motor, or with a mainspring and gears, or with gears driven by compressed air. The Aeroscope was a compressed air camera designed by Prószyński, one that proved reliable and popular. Hundreds of Aeroscopes were used during World War I by British war journalists. Sales continued into the 1920s.

In January 1925, Abel Gance began shooting Napoléon using a wide variety of innovative techniques, including strapping a camera to a man's chest, a snow sled, a horse's saddle, a pendulum swing, and wrapping a large sponge around a hand-held camera so that it could be punched by actors during a fight scene. For the Debrie Parvo camera strapped to the horse's saddle, Gance's technical director, engineer Simon Feldman, devised a reversed steam engine for cranking it, powered by two compressed air tanks. Wearing a costume to fit the scene, cameraman Jules Kruger rode another horse to tend the mechanism between shots. Rather than including one or two hand-held scenes for an unusual effect amid an otherwise static film, Gance strove to make his entire film appear as dynamic as possible. It premiered in early 1927.

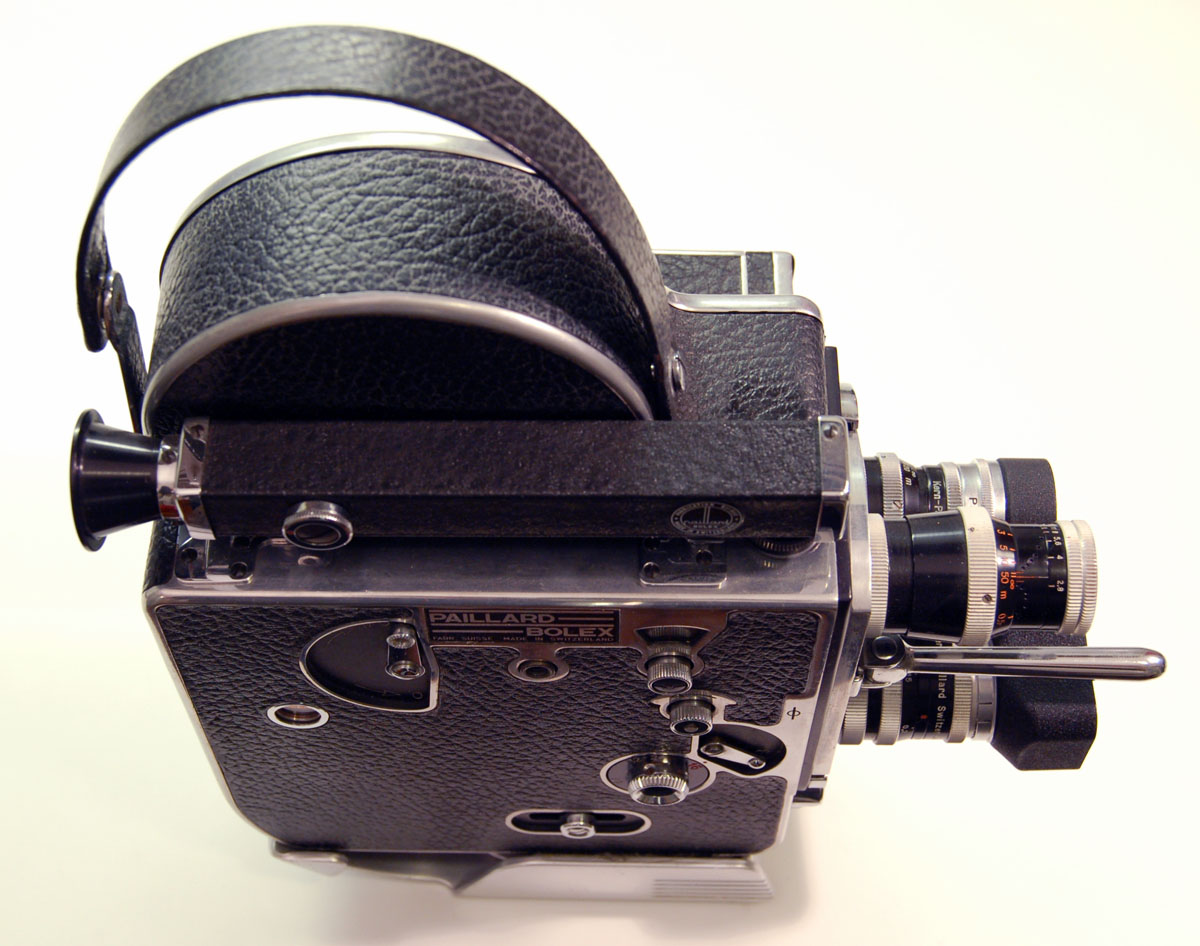
Bolex 16 mm camera

In the 1920s, more cameras such as the Zeiss-Ikon Kinamo, Newman-Sinclair, Eyemo, and De Vry were beginning to be created with hand-held ergonomics in mind. The Bolex camera was introduced using half-width 16 mm film stock. These smaller cameras satisfied the demand from both the growing newsreel and documentary fields, as well as the emerging amateur market. They were specifically designed to hold shorter lengths of film—usually 100 to 200 feet (30 to 60 m)—and were driven by hand-wound mainspring clockworks which could last continuously through most or even all of a film roll on one winding. These cameras saw limited use in professional filmmaking. Further examples of limited hand-held work in the late 1920s include J. Stuart Blackton's The Passionate Quest (1926), Sidney Franklin's Quality Street (1927), and Cecil B. DeMille's The King of Kings (1927).

=== Sound film ===
The emergence of the sound film had an immediate dampening effect on the use of hand-held shots because the film camera motors were too loud to be able to record synchronized sound on set, and thus early sound films were forced to install the camera within a soundproof booth. By 1929, camera manufacturers and studios had devised shells, called blimps, to encase the camera and dampen the mechanical noise sufficiently to allow the cameras to be free of the booths. However, this came at a cost: the blimped, motorized cameras were considerably heavier. When the soon-to-be ubiquitous Mitchell Camera BNC (Blimped Newsreel Camera) emerged in 1934, it weighed in at 135 lb; this clearly precluded any hand-held usage. The aesthetic style of films from this period thus reflected their available technology, and hand-held shots were for the most part avoided.

Hand-held shots required use of the smaller hand-wound spring-work cameras, which were too loud to be practical for any shots requiring synchronized (sync) sound, and held less footage than studio cameras. The spring-wound cameras were also not accurate enough speed-wise to guarantee perfect sync speed, which led to many of them having motors installed (the additional sound being negligible). Thus, these cameras could not be used for much in the way of dialogue.

They were joined by the revolutionary new Arriflex 35 camera, introduced in 1937, which was the first reflex camera for motion pictures. This camera also facilitated hand-held usage by integrating its motor into a handle below the camera body, allowing easy hand-held support, and weighing a mere 12 lb. Most of these cameras saw steady usage during World War II by both sides for documentary purposes, and the Eyemos and Arriflexes in particular were mass manufactured for the Allied and Axis militaries, respectively. This allowed these cameras to be exposed to a much greater number of individuals than would have normally familiarized themselves with them; many wartime cameramen would eventually bring them back into the film industry where they are used to this day. With the Allied capture of Arriflexes, along with the release of the new Arriflex II in 1946, many curious non-German cameramen finally had access to the advanced camera. Eclair followed this up with the Cameflex the following year. It was a lightweight (13 lb) camera specifically designed for hand-held shots and could be switched between shooting 35 mm and 16 mm. In 1952, Arri subsequently released the Arriflex 16ST, the first reflex camera designed specifically for 16 mm.

== New Wave revival ==
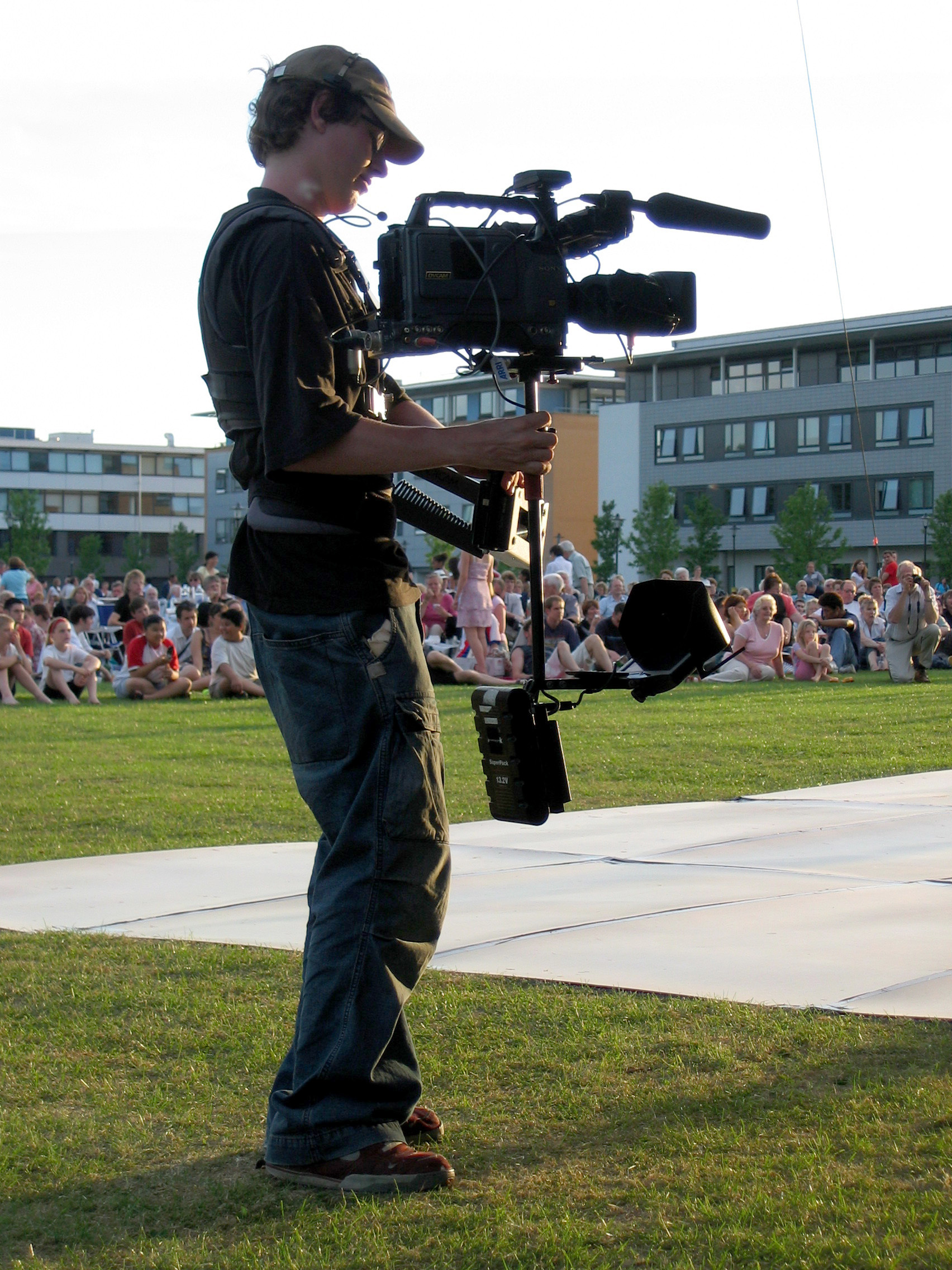
A balanced Steadicam avoids shakiness. It is not directly hand-held.

Despite these technological developments, the aesthetic consequences of these smaller cameras weren't fully realized until the late 1950s and early 1960s. A hand-held camera was used in 1958 on the documentary film The Snowshoers (Les Raquetteurs), shot on 35 mm by Michel Brault. When Jean Rouch met Brault and saw his work, he asks him to come to France, and show his technique. For some context on this film, relationship of documentary sound and image, and Brault's cinema, see Direct Cinema.

This trend, led by Michel Brault, was followed by Raoul Coutard's work in the French New Wave and the cinéma vérité, "fly-on-the-wall" documentary film aesthetic. In the case of the latter, Richard Leacock and D.A. Pennebaker actually had to force the 16 mm technology forward themselves through a number of extensive camera and audio recording equipment modifications in order to achieve longer-take, sync sound, observational films, beginning with Primary (1960).

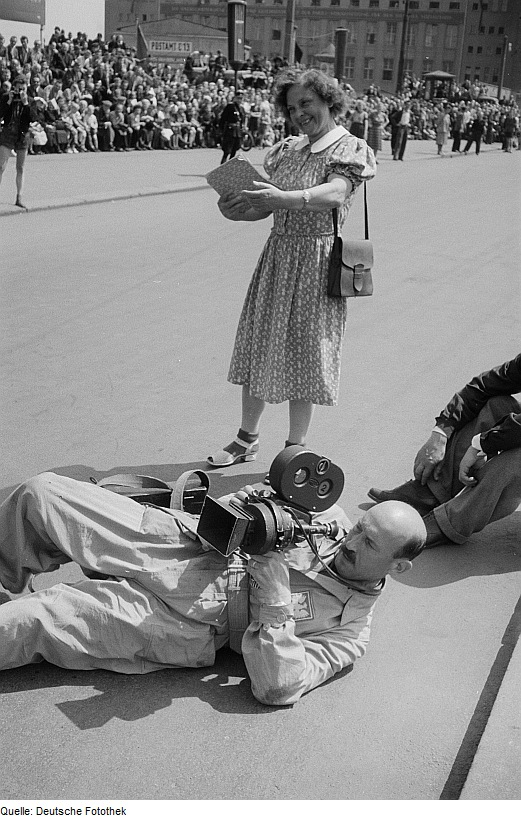
A cameraman shoots a street scene from a low perspective

In the realm of 16 mm cameras, Michel Coutant at Éclair was working with Brault and Rouch's input to create prototypes that eventually led to the self-blimped Eclair 16 (also known as the Eclair NPR or Eclair Coutant ), the first successful lightweight sync-sound movie camera. The design included a camera magazine which not only was back-mounted specifically to distribute a more balanced camera weight across the shoulder for hand-holding, but also included a built-in pressure plate and sprocket drive, which allowed cameras to be reloaded in seconds — a crucial feature for vérité documentaries.

Rouch's 1961 Chronicle of a Summer was shot by Coutard and Brault on a prototype that led to the Eclair 16. Arri took many years to catch up, debuting the popular Arriflex 16BL in 1965, but not including quick-change magazines until the Arriflex 16SR ten years later. In the meantime, Eclair had also a much smaller and ergonomic hand-held 16mm camera, the Eclair ACL (1971), an improvement also spurred by Rouch's drive for equipment that matched his vision of cinema.

== Sources ==
- Cahiers du Cinéma No.144., June 1963.
- Ascher, Steven; Pincus, Edward (1999). The Filmmaker's Handbook: A Comprehensive Guide for the Digital Age. New York: Plume.
- Salt, Barry (1992). Film Style and Technology: History and Analysis. London: Starword. ISBN 978-0-9509066-2-1.
- Steeman, Albert. Classic Motion Picture Cameras. Retrieved 2007-01-03.
