= Debrie =

Manufacturer of cinema cameras and projectors

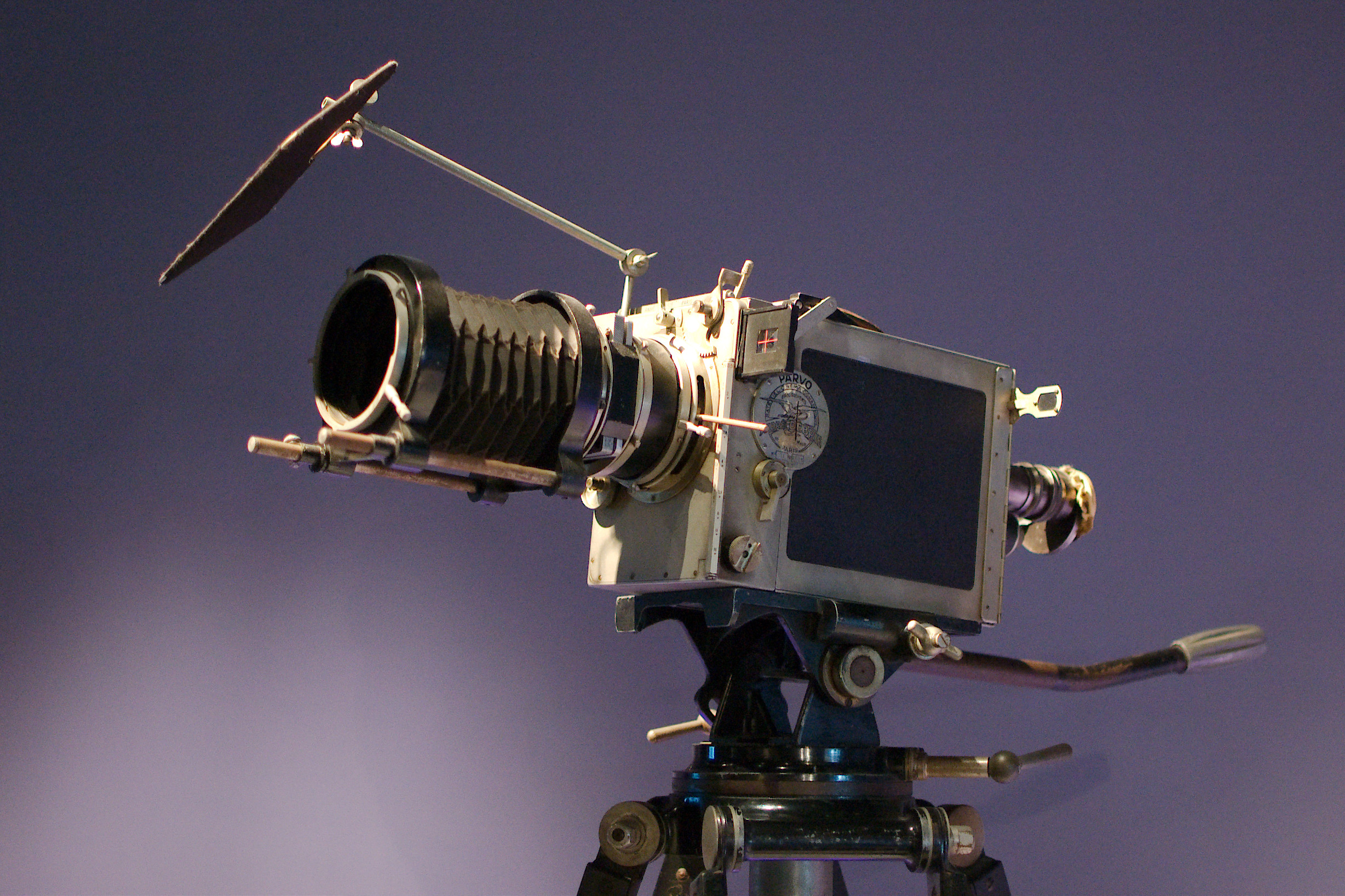
A Model L Parvo from 1927

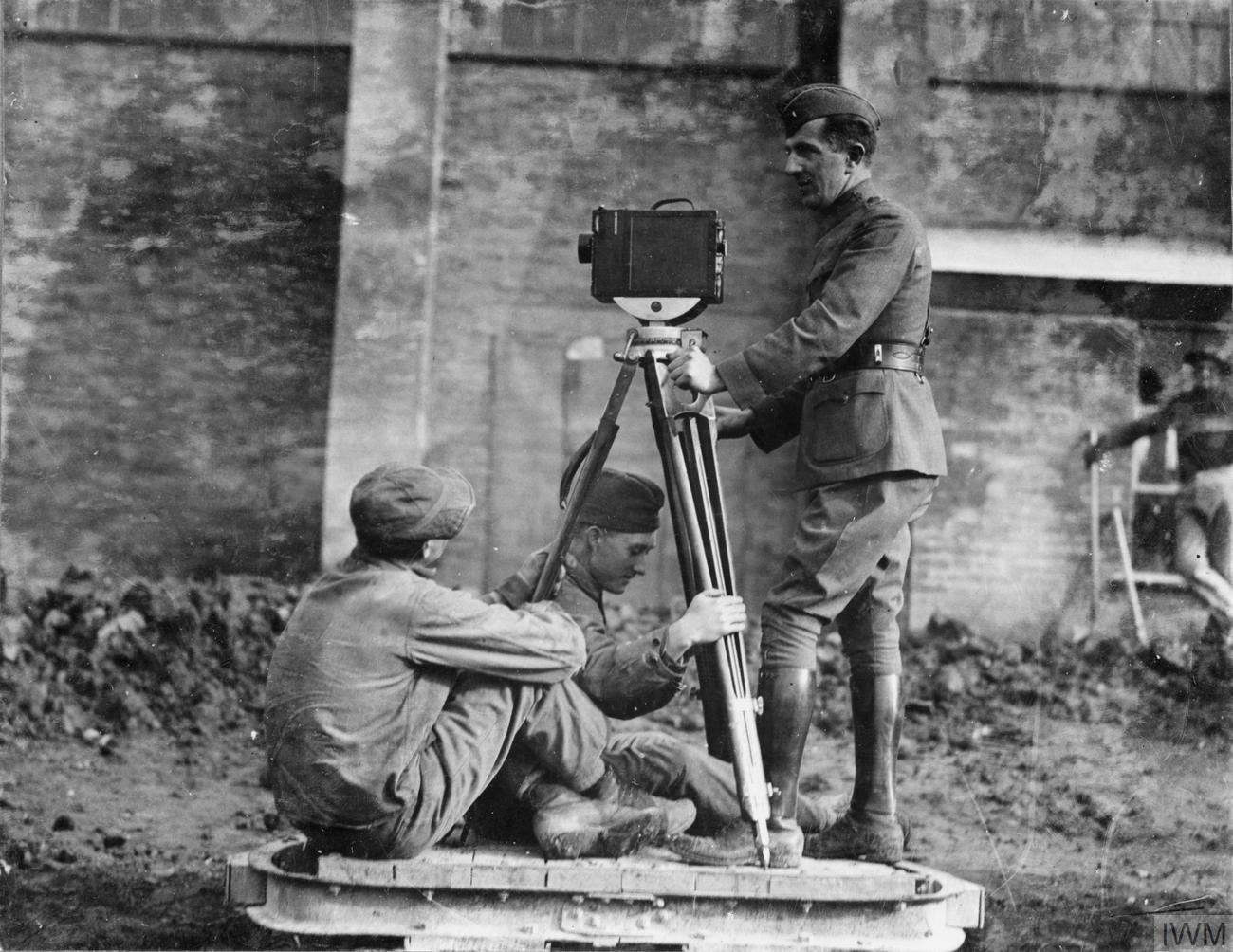
U.S. Army Signal Corps official photographers with a Debrie camera, 1918

Debrie was a French manufacturer of cinema cameras and projectors, founded in 1900.

Joseph Jules Debrie and later his son André Debrie developed a range of cinema cameras and projectors, starting with the Parvo, which Joseph patented on 19 September 1908.

André Debrie took over control of the company from 1919.
