= Bill Genaust =

American journalist (1906–1945)

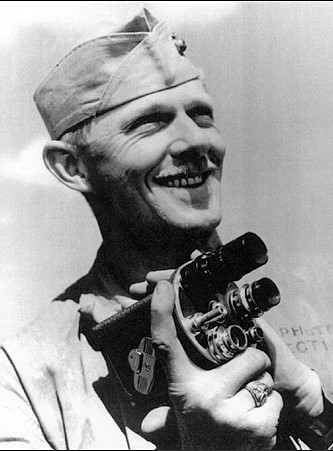
- Born: October 12, 1906; Sioux Falls, South Dakota, U.S.
- Died: March 4, 1945 (aged 38); Iwo Jima, Volcano Islands, Japanese Empire
- Burial place: body not recovered
- Military career
- Allegiance: United States of America
- Branch: United States Marine Corps
- Service years: 1943–1945
- Rank: Sergeant
- Conflicts: World War II; Battle of Saipan; Battle of Iwo Jima †
- Awards: Bronze Star (w/ Combat 'V'); Purple Heart (2)

William Homer Genaust (October 12, 1906 – March 4, 1945) was an American war photographer during World War II best known for filming the second U.S. flag-raising on top of Mount Suribachi on February 23, 1945, which was immortalized in Joe Rosenthal's famous photograph Raising the Flag on Iwo Jima.

Genaust was a sergeant in the United States Marine Corps during the Pacific War operating a then-modern and lightweight 16 millimeter motion picture camera which used 50-foot color film cassettes. His motion picture of the flag-raising became one of the best-known film clips of the war, and documents the event famously depicted in the Marine Corps War Memorial in Arlington, Virginia. Genaust was reportedly killed in action nine days later during the Battle of Iwo Jima, and his remains have not been recovered.

== Early life ==
Entire reel of Genaust's surviving Iwo Jima footage, including scenes preceding and following the flag-raisings on Iwo Jima, digitally scanned in 2016 by the Motion Picture Preservation Lab at the National Archives

William Homer Genaust was born on October 12, 1906 in Sioux Falls, South Dakota, and raised in Minneapolis, Minnesota. He enlisted in the United States Marine Corps in Minneapolis on February 11, 1943, at the age of 36, to be a combat cameraman. After recruit training, he was sent to Quantico, Virginia, to become a Marine Corps still photographer and motion picture camera photographer.

== U.S. Marine Corps ==
=== Battle of Saipan ===
Genaust served in the Pacific Theater during World War II and was posthumously awarded the Bronze Star Medal with Combat "V" and Purple Heart Medal in September 1945, for heroic actions using a rifle in a firefight on Saipan where he was wounded on July 9, 1944. He was recommended for the Navy Cross by Norman Hatch, his photo section commander, but the nomination was turned down because Genaust was a cameraman and not an infantryman. He also shared in the Navy Presidential Unit Citation awarded to the 4th Marine Division for the Battle of Saipan and Tinian (June 15 – August 1, 1944). It took eight months for Genaust to recover from his leg wound he obtained on Saipan. He was given the opportunity to return home, but instead he volunteered to go to Iwo Jima during the Volcano and Ryukyu Islands campaign.

=== Battle of Iwo Jima ===
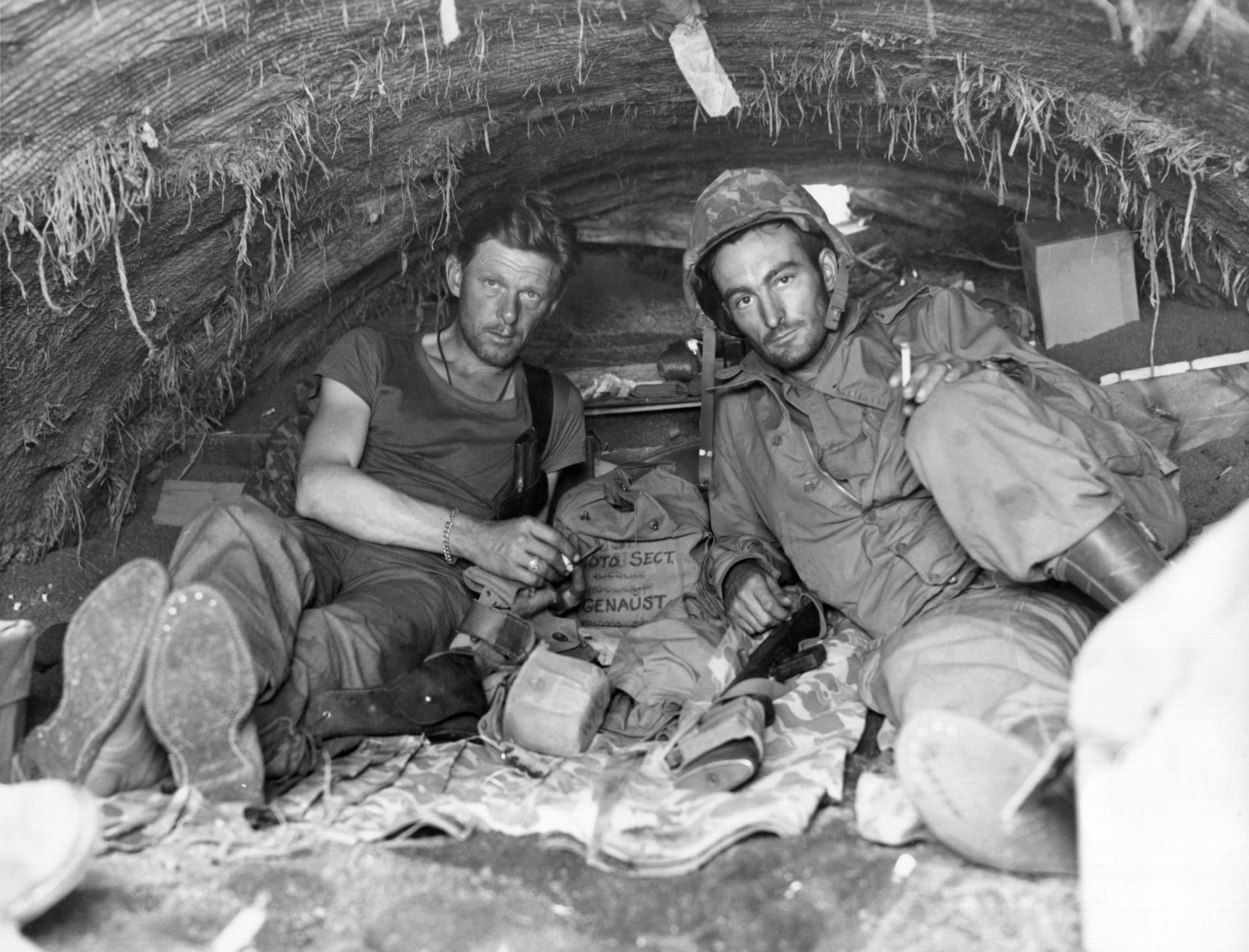
U.S. Marine cinematographers Bill Genaust (left) and Atlee S. Tracy on Iwo Jima (February 24, 1945)

Portion of Genaust's footage of the second flag-raising on Iwo Jima used in the 1945 film To the Shores of Iwo Jima

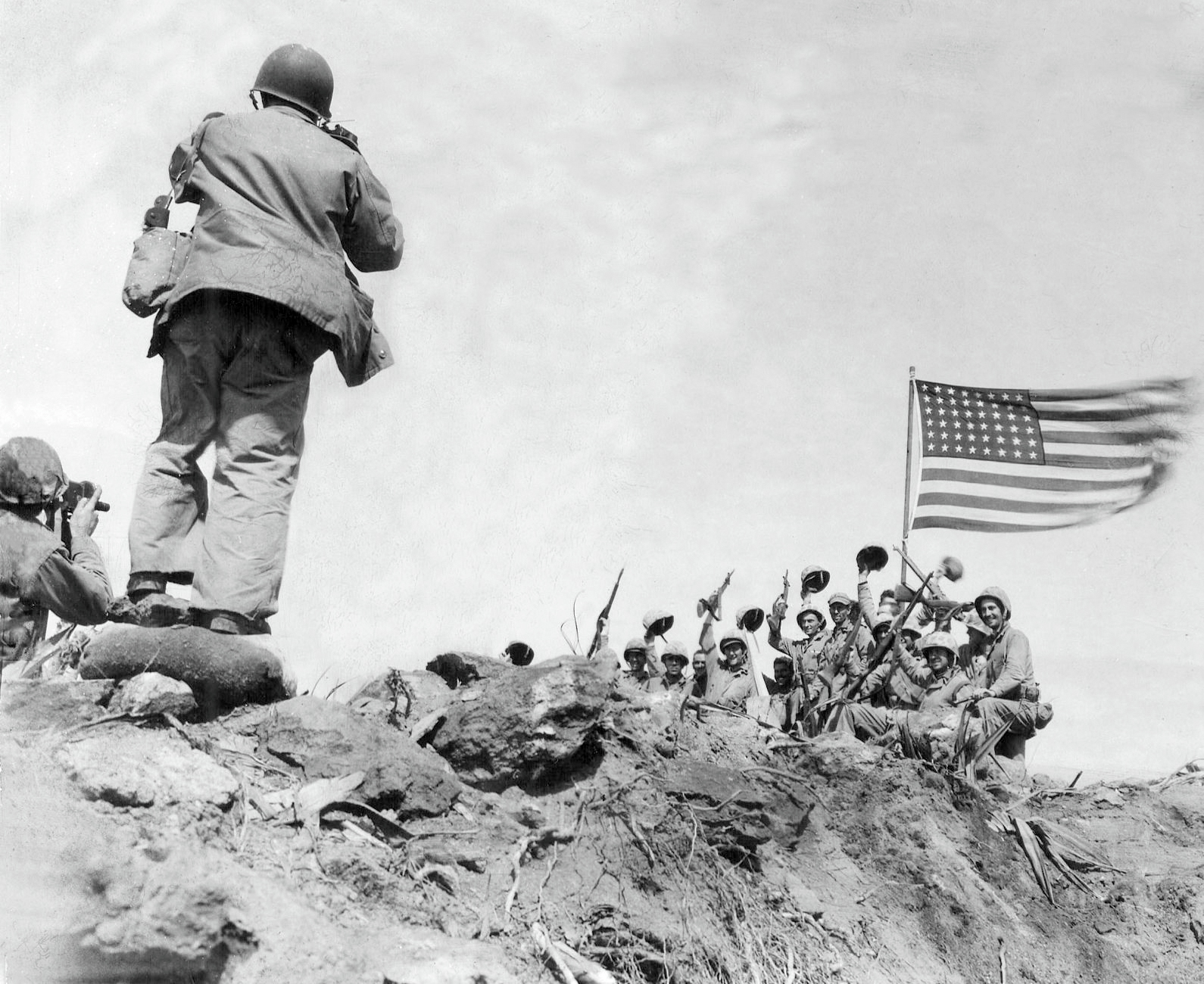
Genaust (left, with motion picture camera) and Joe Rosenthal capturing what became known as the "Gung Ho" image of the Marines present at the second flag-raising on Iwo Jima (February 23, 1945)

Genaust was assigned to help train Marine photographers on how to film in a combat zone. There were three Marine divisions in a force of approximately 70,000 servicemen which included about 60 Marine cameramen training to assault Iwo Jima. Genaust would accompany the Marine infantrymen riding in and on landing craft. On February 19, filming on the way in, Genaust landed on the beach with members of the 4th Marine Division. On the third day, he moved closer to Mount Suribachi where the 28th Marines, 5th Marine Division were located with orders to capture the mountaintop. There he teamed with Marine still photographer, Private First Class Bob Campbell, and proceeded to take more film action at the base of Suribachi.

On February 23, 1945, a 40-man patrol consisting primarily of members of Third Platoon, E Company, 2nd Battalion, 28th Marines, 5th Marine Division were ordered to climb up Mount Suribachi and seize and occupy the summit. The patrol was led by E Company's executive officer, First Lieutenant Harold Schrier, who had volunteered to take over the platoon and raise the battalion's small American flag to signal the volcano was captured. The flag, which was attached to a Japanese iron water pipe, was raised approximately 10:30 a.m., by Schrier, his platoon sergeant Ernest Ivy Thomas Jr., and another sergeant. Marine photographer Staff Sergeant Lou Lowery accompanied the patrol and photographed the Marines and Navy corpsmen climbing to the top of Mount Suribachi, the Marines tying the flag on the pipe, and the men around the flagstaff after it was raised.

Around noon, Marine photographers Sergeant Genaust and Private Campbell were ordered to go up Mount Suribachi. On the way there, they met Associated Press photographer Joe Rosenthal, who first arrived on Iwo Jima with the 4th Marine Division on February 19 (he went back and forth from a ship each day), but missed the first flag raising on top. The three photographers proceeded to climb up Mount Suribachi together as four Marines from Second Platoon, E Company, also climbed up with orders to raise a large replacement flag on top. On the way up, Rosenthal, Genaust, and Campbell met Lowery coming down who told them about the first American flag raising. Once on top, another Japanese pipe was found and the second and larger U.S. flag was attached unto it which would make a single flag on top more visible from any point on the island. After the three got on top, Genaust with his Bell & Howell Auto Master Filmo 16mm Motion Picture Camera, stood at the left side of Rosenthal, and filmed the second flag being hoisted by six Marines. Under Lt. Schrier's orders, the larger flag was raised as the smaller flag was lowered.

Genaust's film captured the six Marines getting in place to raise the larger flag, the raising of the flag/flagstaff, and the securing of the bottom of the flagstaff with rocks. Rosenthal became famous for taking the black and white photograph of the second flag raising which appeared in Sunday newspapers on February 25. Similar still photographs were also taken on top of Mount Suribachi by Campbell and other photographers including a U.S. Army and U.S. Coast Guard photographer. Genaust's film also captures other Marines on the summit as they gaze up at the flag during the second flag raising. These Marines are not visible in Rosenthal's famous photograph.

=== Death ===
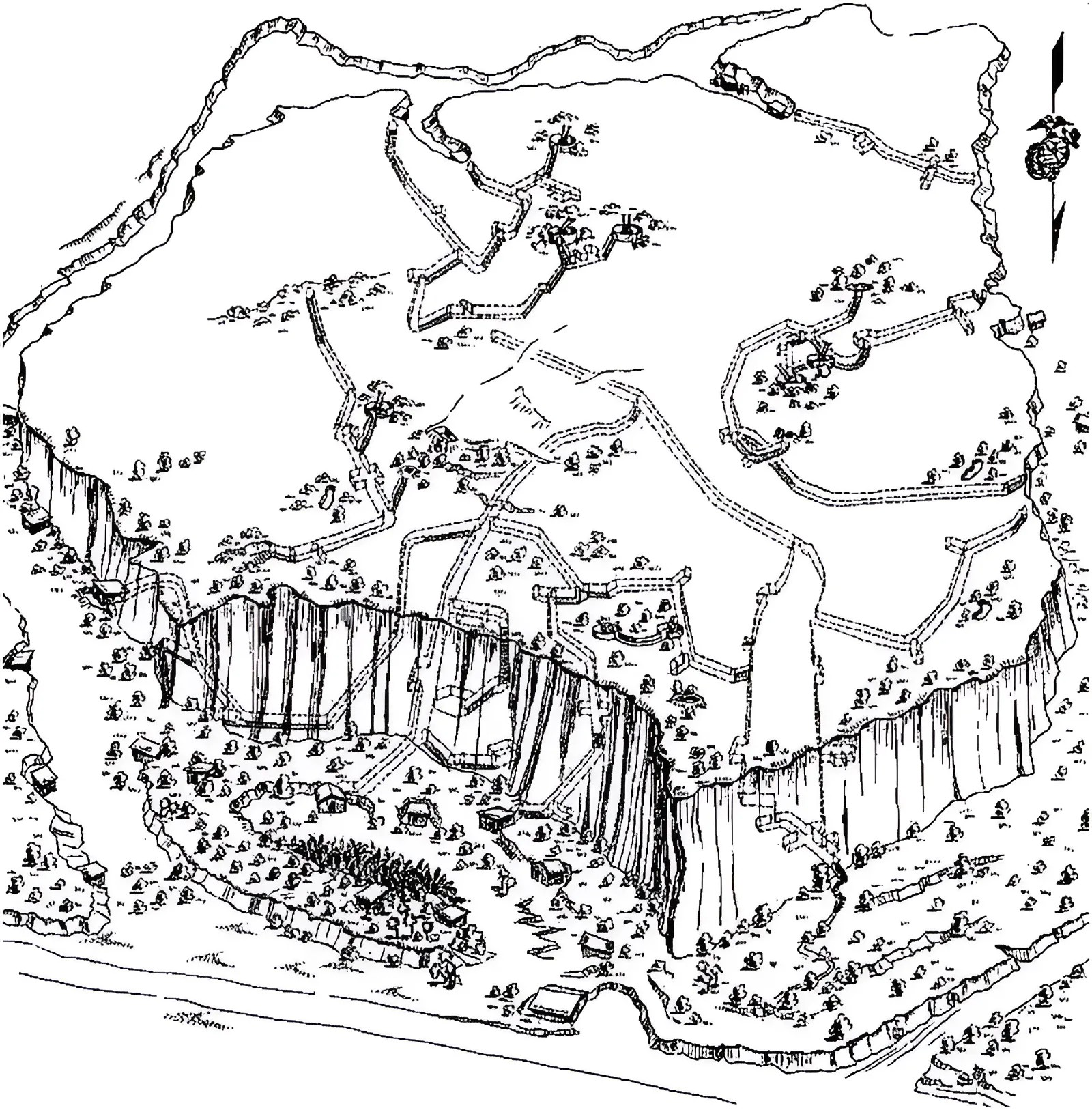
Hill 362A on Iwo Jima looking at top and north face, with dotted lines indicating the Japanese tunnel system

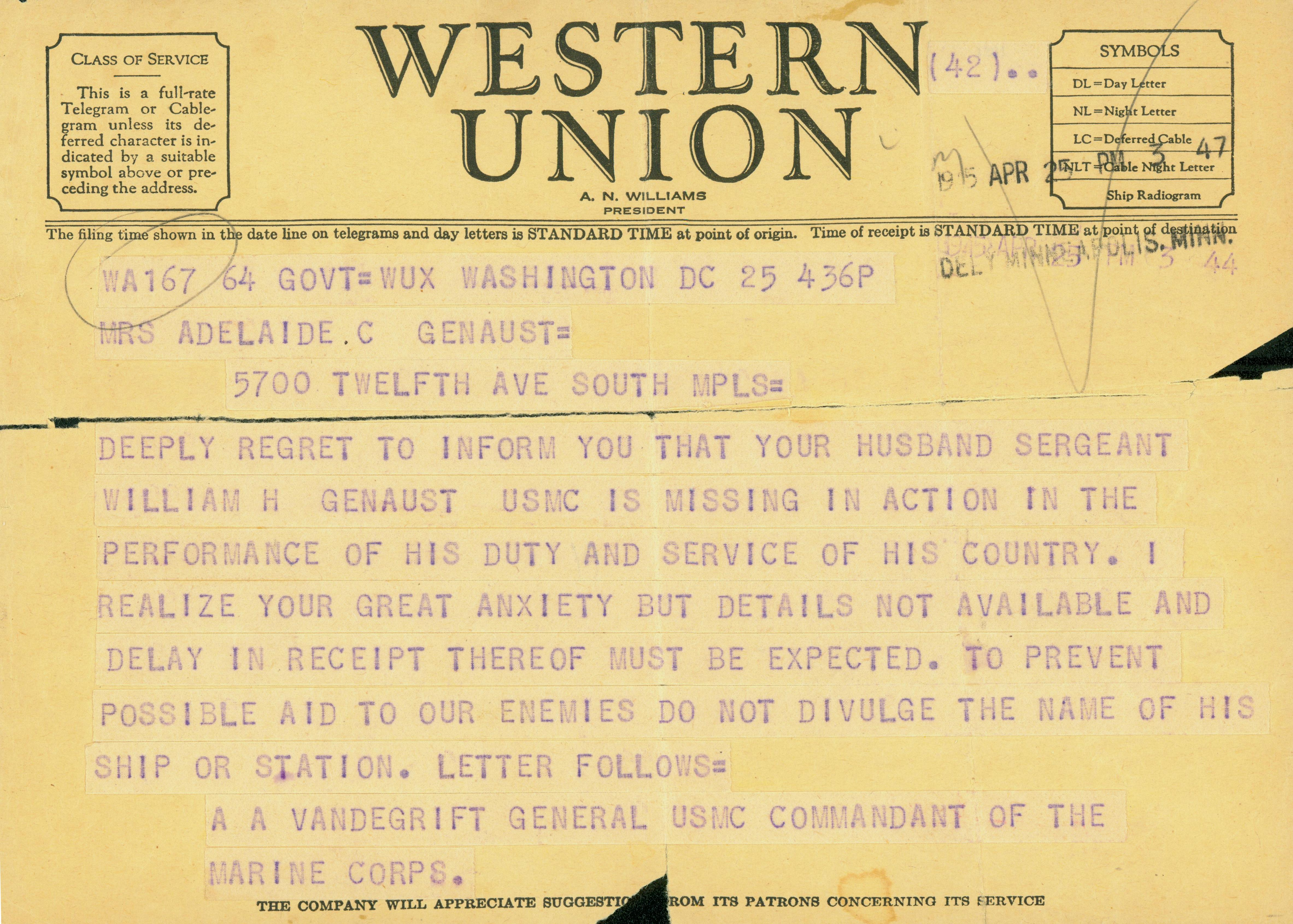
Telegram received by Genaust's wife, stating he was missing in action

On March 3, 1945, Genaust was reported missing in action after he was shot in a large cave at or around Hill 362-A, located on the northern part of Iwo Jima. On March 4, he was ruled killed in action. After talking with two photographers at Iwo Jima, Genaust's friend, Lieutenant-Colonel Donald L. Dickson offered the following account of his death in a letter to his widow:

As I understand it, a group of Marines were clearing caves of die-hard Japs. Grenades were thrown in one cave and it was believed all the enemy were killed. The Marines wanted to double check and asked Bill if they could borrow his flashlight. Bill said he would go in with them. They crawled in and Bill flashed his light around. There were many Japs still alive and they immediately opened fire. Bill dropped without a sound. As the bearer of the light he had been the first target for a number of bullets. I feel sure he never knew what happened to him.

The Marines forced the Japs deeper into the cave but could not get them out. More men would have been killed in carrying out of the narrow cave Bill's lifeless body.

TNT charges were quickly placed at the cave mouth and exploded. The whole cave mouth was blocked with earth from the explosion and Bill's body was completely buried by it.

Photo section commander Norman Hatch gave some detail on the circumstances around Genaust's death. He reported that, because of poor lighting conditions on Iwo Jima, Genaust had joined an infantry team clearing caves and tunnels. At one cave, a Japanese soldier was found sitting at a table and shuffling routine paperwork. The Marines called out but were unable to get his attention. An interpreter, a lieutenant, was brought in to speak to the soldier in Japanese, but he received no response. As the patrol leader got ready to go underground to investigate, he asked Genaust for his flashlight. Genaust said he would go in himself and talk to the Japanese soldier. Two-thirds of the way into the cave Genaust was shot by machine-gun fire coming from a hidden entrance. The lieutenant ordered the cave closed, and Genaust's body was buried in the blast.

Despite renewed search efforts in 2007, the body of Genaust has not been recovered. He is among 250 Americans listed missing on Iwo Jima, although most of those were lost at sea.

Letter to Genaust's widow, with an account of his death

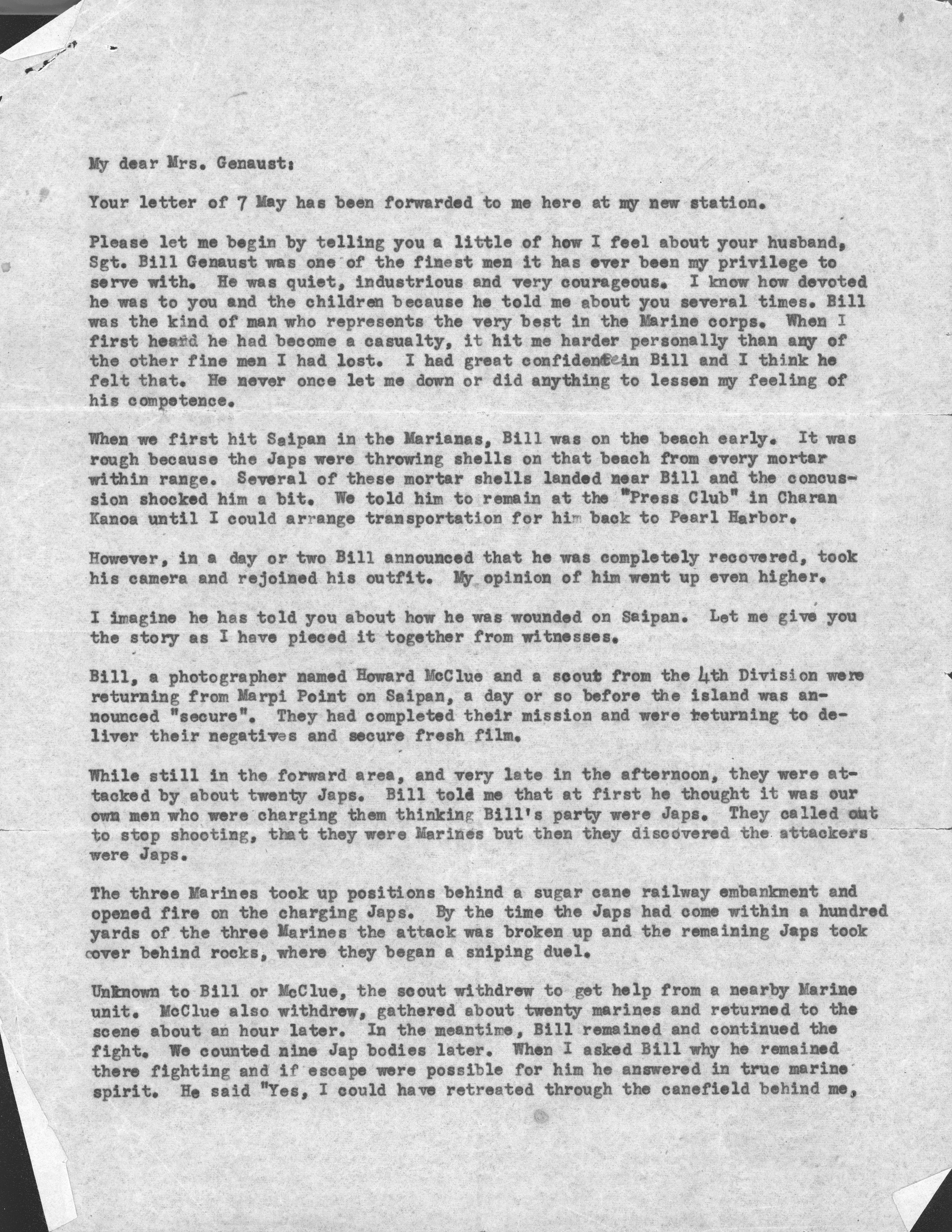
Page 1

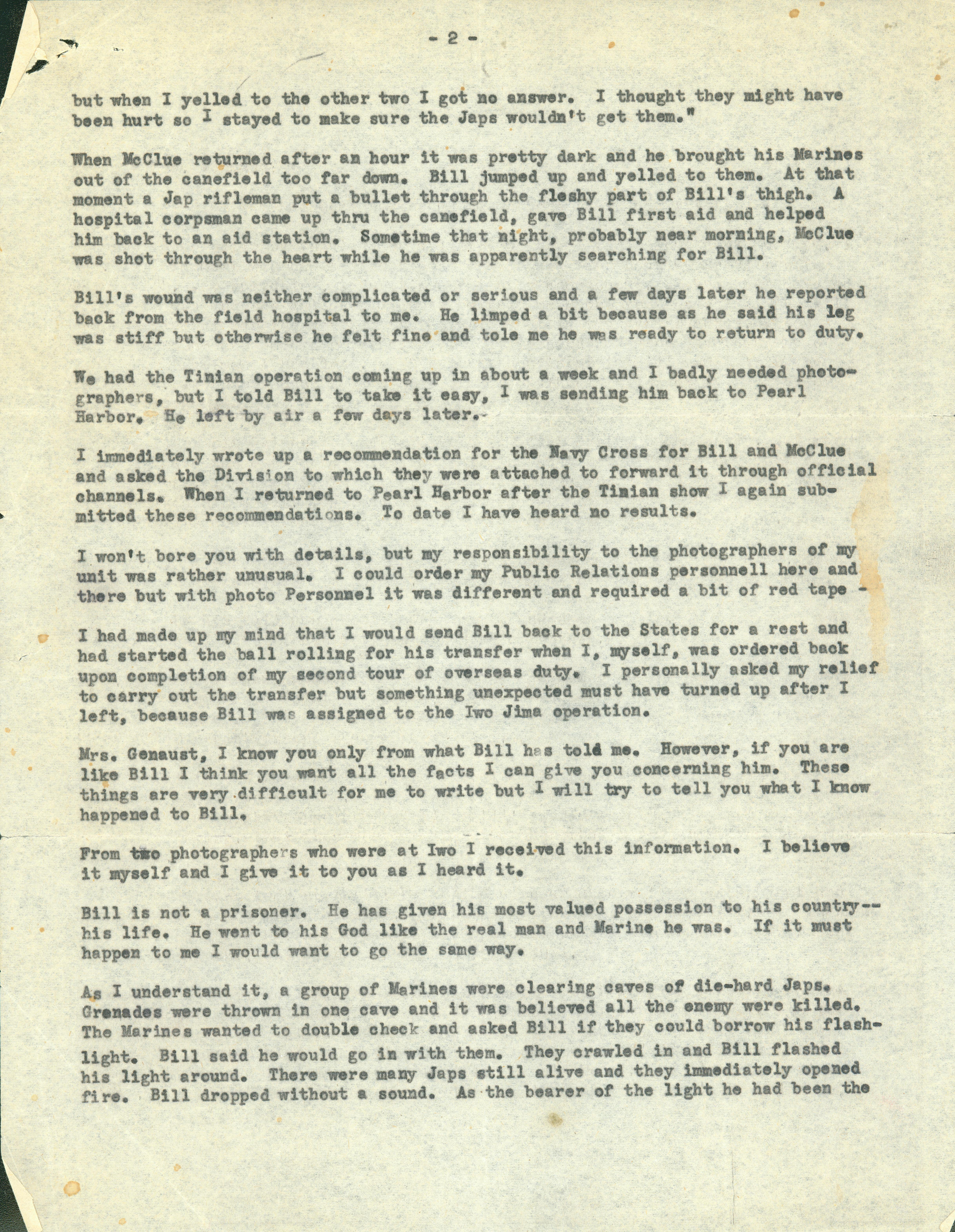
Page 2

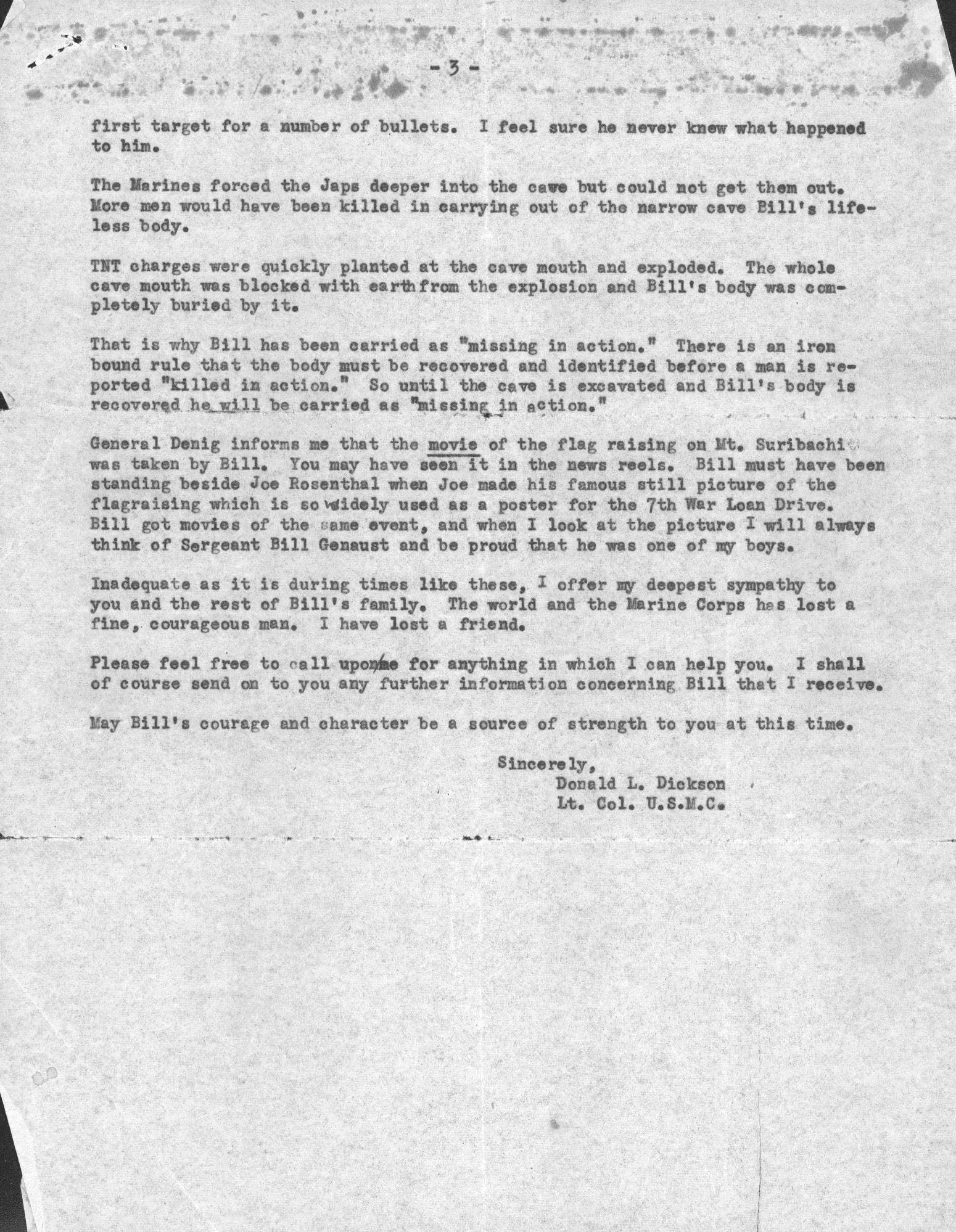
Page 3

== Military awards ==
Genaust's military decorations and awards include the following:

Bronze Star Medal w/ Combat "V"	Purple Heart Medal w/ one 5/16" Gold Star	
Combat Action Ribbon	Navy Presidential Unit Citation	Navy Unit Commendation
American Campaign Medal	Asiatic-Pacific Campaign Medal w/ two 3/16" bronze stars	World War II Victory Medal

Certificate of Appreciation

Genaust received a posthumous Certificate of Appreciation from the Commandant of the Marine Corps, General Paul X. Kelley on April 26, 1984.

== Honors ==
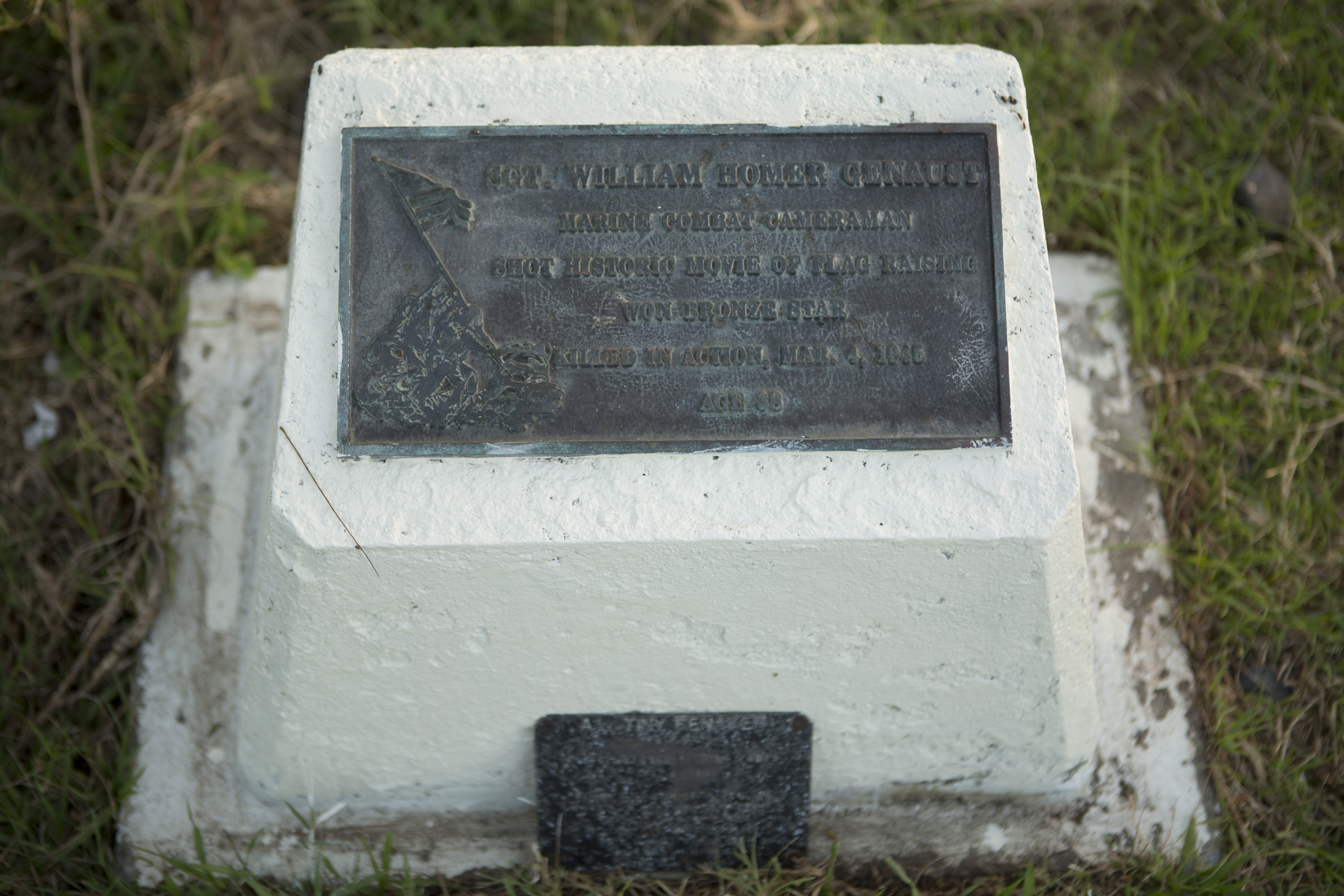
Genaust's plaque at the Mount Suribachi Memorial, site of the flag-raising on Iwo Jima

In 1995, a bronze plaque honoring Genaust was placed at the Mount Suribachi Memorial, site of the flag-raising on Iwo Jima.

The Sergeant William Genaust Award is presented each year by the Marine Corps Heritage Foundation, one of a series of awards to both Marines and civilian community members recognizing their work in advancing and preserving Marine Corps history. It is given for a documentary and short subject (15 minutes or less) dealing creatively with U.S. Marine Corps heritage or Marine Corps life.

== See also ==
- Marine Corps War Memorial
