= With the Marines at Tarawa =

1944 film by Louis Hayward

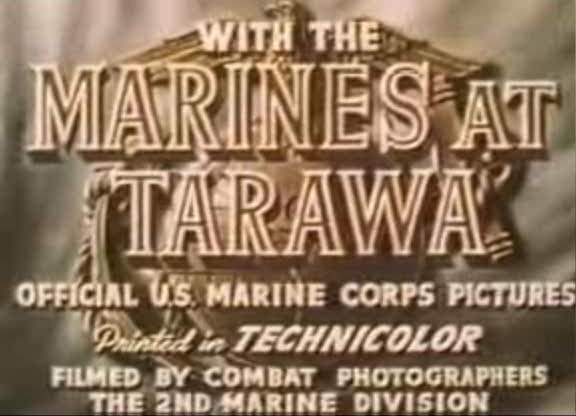
- Title screen
- Directed by: Louis Hayward (uncredited)
- Cinematography: Norman Hatch
- Production company: United States Marine Corps
- Distributed by: Universal Pictures
- Release date: March 2, 1944
- Running time: 18 minutes
- Country: United States
- Language: English

With the Marines at Tarawa is a 1944 short documentary film directed by Louis Hayward. It uses authentic footage taken at the Battle of Tarawa to tell the story of the American servicemen from the time they get the news that they are to participate in the invasion to the final taking of the island and raising of the Stars and Stripes.

== Synopsis ==
Most of the film is in full color and it uses no actors, making it a valuable historical document. The documentary showed more gruesome scenes of battle than other war films to date. Marine Staff Sergeant Norman Hatch, armed with a .45 caliber pistol and a Bell & Howell hand-cranked Eyemo camera, captured 35mm film footage as near as 15 yards away from the enemy during combat. According to the documentary The War, President Franklin D. Roosevelt himself gave approval for showing the film, against the wishes of many advisors.

Since the pictures were far too graphic to meet the standards of Hollywood producers and distributors, only the President could grant permission for its release to the general public. President Roosevelt consulted the only man who was present at the Battle of Tarawa that he personally knew and trusted, Time-Life photographer Robert Sherrod. Quoting Sherrod, "I tell the President the truth. Our soldiers on the front want people back home to know that they don't knock the hell out of them every day of every battle. They want people to understand that war is a horrible, nasty business, and to say otherwise is to do a disservice to those who died." Based on Sherrod's prompting, FDR agreed to release the film, uncensored.

The film won the 1944 Oscar for Best Documentary Short Subject. The Oscar was presented to the US Marine Corps, and today a replica Oscar is displayed at the National Museum of the Marine Corps. Due to the shortages of metals needed during the war effort, the Academy presented the Marine Corps with a plaster statue in the shape of a tablet. It is also housed at the same museum, but is not on display.

The Academy Film Archive preserved With the Marines at Tarawa in 2005.

The film.

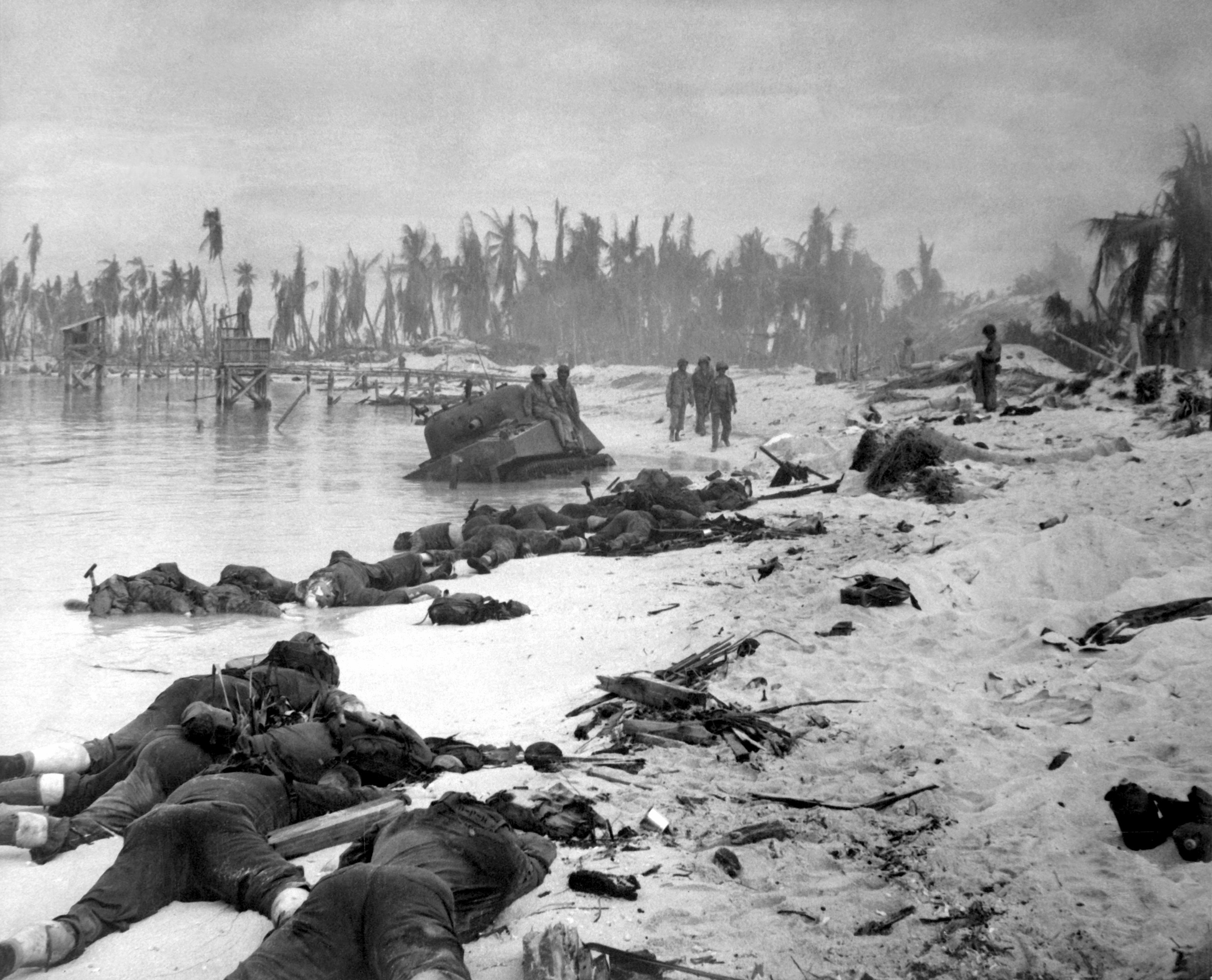
Tarawa beach, where the graphic footage of American corpses was filmed.

== See also ==
- List of American films of 1944
