= Eyemo =

35 mm motion picture film camera

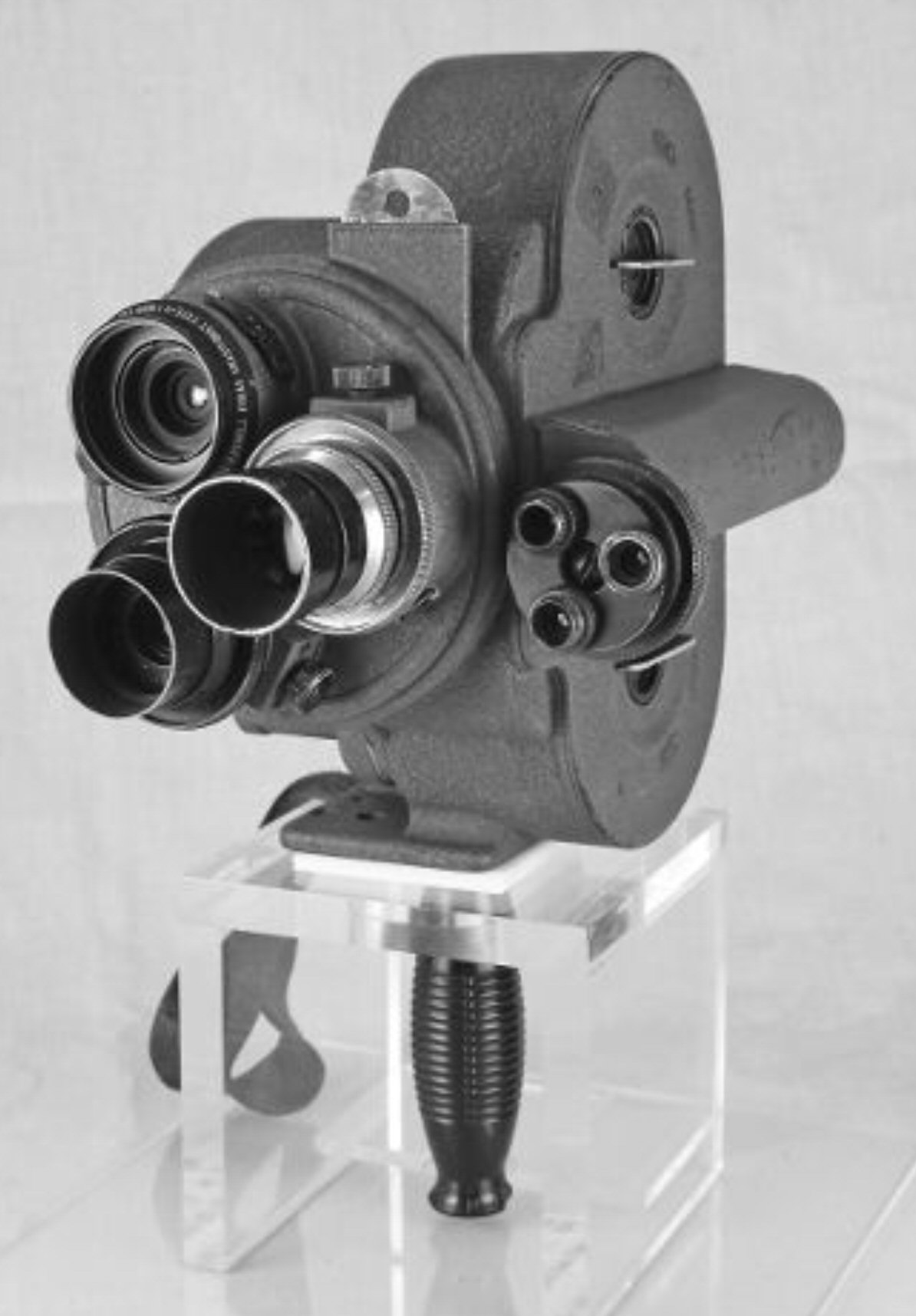
Bell & Howell Eyemo camera

The Bell & Howell Eyemo is a 35 mm motion picture film camera which was manufactured by the Bell & Howell Co. of Chicago.

== Background ==
Designed and first manufactured in 1925, it was for many years the most compact 35 mm motion picture film camera, having a 100-foot film capacity. Its small size and ruggedness made it a favorite choice for newsreel and combat cameramen, and also found use for fiction and documentary filmmakers whenever a portable, rugged, and inconspicuous camera was needed.

The U.S. Army's Signal Corps estimated that the Eyemo was responsible for shooting around 90% of combat motion-picture they shot during World War II.

The Eyemo is still in use by some filmmakers. It is often used these days as a "crash-cam" for filming dangerous stunts and explosions, and shots in which the camera must be dropped from a building or other elevation.

The 2000 film 'Requiem For A Dream' utilized an Eyemo camera with a Nikon lens mount for POV 'snorricam' shots where it was attached to the actors.

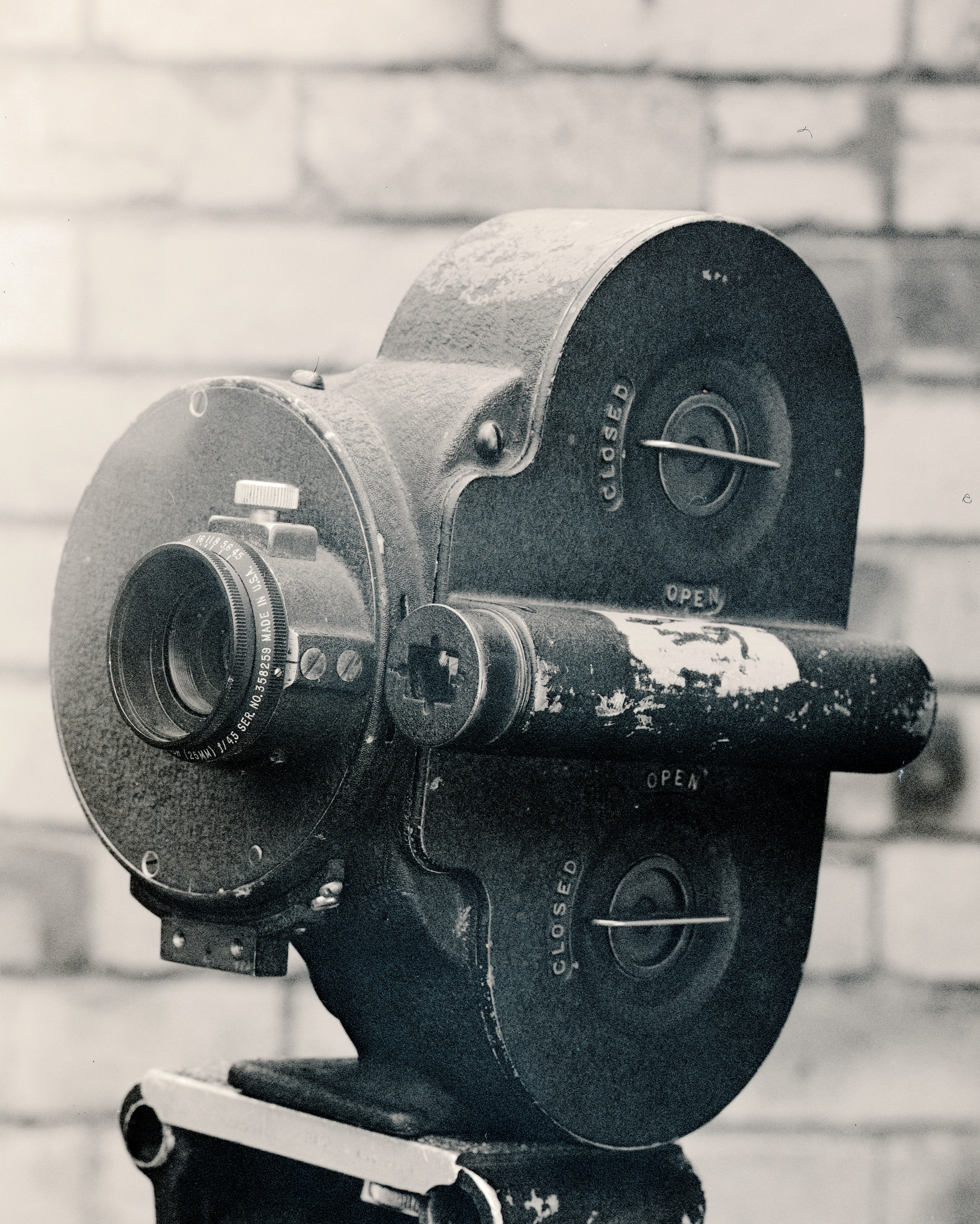
a single lens model of the Eyemo

== Construction ==
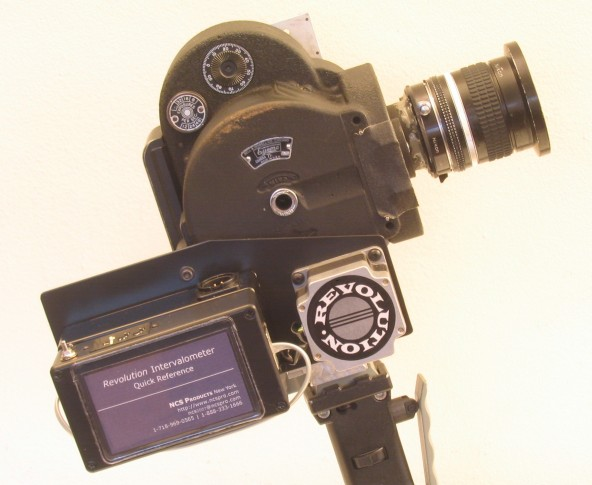
Eyemo with Motor and Nikon Lens

The Eyemo is a non-reflex camera: viewing while filming is through an optical viewfinder incorporated into the camera lid. Some models take one lens only. In 1929 there was the first three-port Eyemo, while the "spider model" features a rotating three-lens turret and a "focusing viewfinder" on the side opposite the optical viewfinder. Eyemos feature a 1 1/2 in (38 mm) diameter lens mount except the 71-k model, which is slightly different.

Eyemos feature a built-in clockwork (spring wind) motor which, when wound by a ratchet key, can shoot about 20 seconds of film per winding at standard 24 fps (frames per second) speed, and also runs at speeds of four through 64 fps, depending on the model. The camera can be hand-cranked with a manual crank accessory. Several optional electric motors are available; some use DC battery power while others use household AC current. There is currently a synchronized motor available for sync sound filming, but no commercially available camera blimp to reduce the camera's noise.

The Eyemo takes an internal load of 100 ft (30 m) of film, which lasts for slightly over one minute when filming at 24 fps. Some models also accept a 400 ft (120 m) or 1,000 ft (300 m) magazine that is attached to the back, and can hold 4 1/3 and 11 minutes of film respectively. When used with a 400 ft (120 m) magazine, the Eyemo is cumbersome (but not impossible) to operate without the use of a tripod, while the use of a 1000-ft magazine requires tripod support.

Some camera shops have modified Eyemos for reflex viewing, attached video taps and motors to them, and modified the proprietary lens mount to allow the camera to use different optics (such as lenses made for still Nikon cameras).

Bell & Howell also built the successful 16 mm "Filmo" which became first available at the end of 1923. In the 1930s, this camera was marketed as a 'semi professional' camera while the Filmo 127 was introduced as an amateur camera using 8 mm film.

Various government and military organizations used specialty motion picture cameras based on the eyemo mechanics for scientific tests and filming. One manufacturer being MultiData. NASA was a notable organization that used such cameras in one case for testing with lasers.

== Notable uses ==
- With the Marines at Tarawa (1944) – shot by Marine Staff Sergeant Norman Hatch during the Battle of Tarawa
- Day of the Fight (1951) – short shot by Stanley Kubrick on a rented Eyemo
- The Killing (1956) Co-producer Alex Singer used the clockwork single lens Eyemo and thirty-metre loads of film to shoot ‘day in the life’ style racetrack footage in San Francisco. He used only available light, and the authenticity of the footage of the horses being led out and urged into the starting gates so ‘delighted’ Stanley Kubrick that it was spread throughout the film, instead of appearing only in the film titles.
- Psycho (1960) – Multiple cameras used to film shower scene
- The Blues Brothers (1980) - Multiple crash scenes and explosions
- Requiem For a Dream (2000) - All POV shots
- Wuthering Heights (2011) – shot by Robbie Ryan

== See also ==
- Aeroscope
- Konvas
- Filmo
- Debrie Parvo
