= André Debrie =

French businessman (1891–1967)

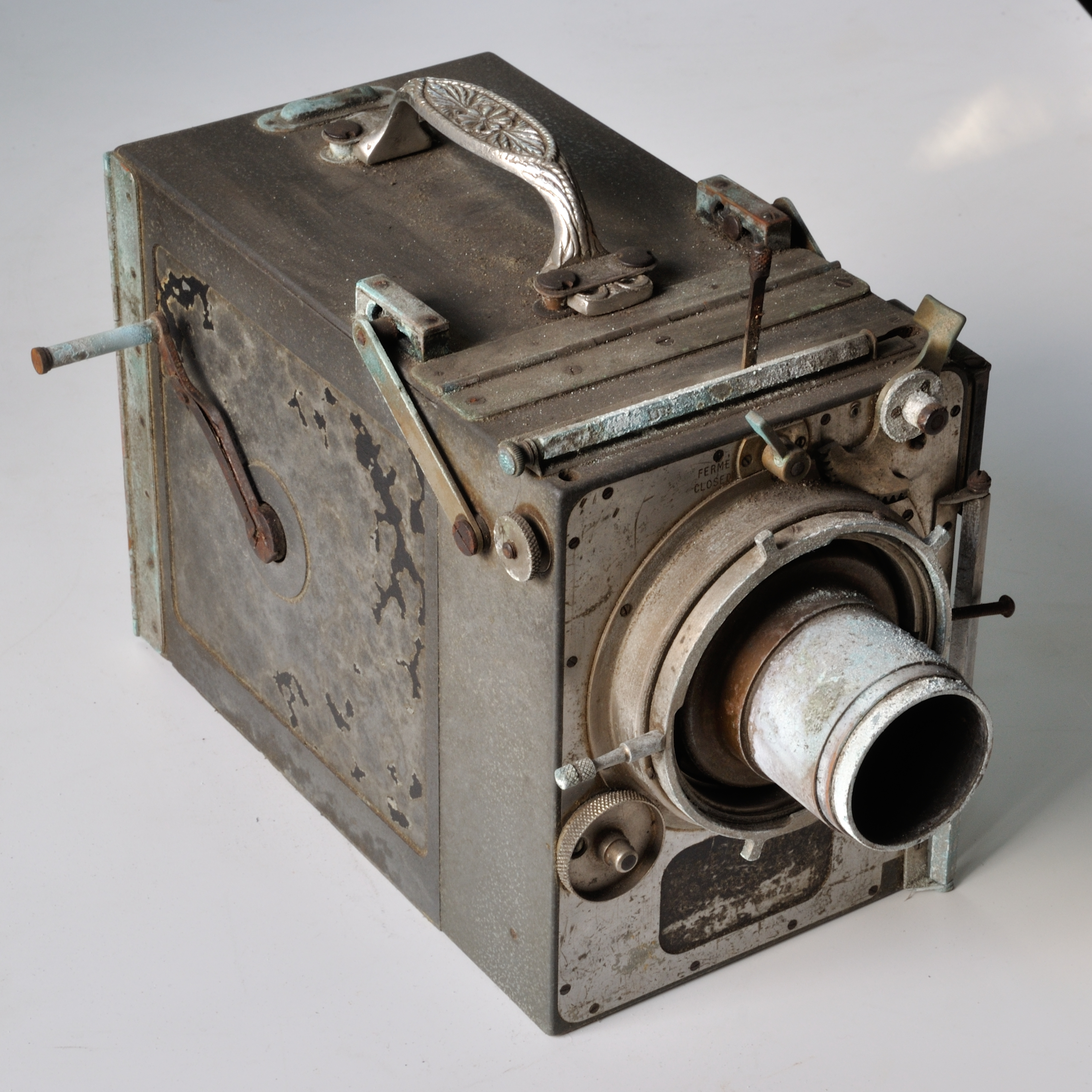
35mm Debrie camera

André Victor Léon Clément Debrie (28 January 1891 - 28 May 1967) was a French manufacturer of cinema cameras, and head of Debrie from 1919.

He was the son of Joseph Jules Debrie, who founded La Société Debrie. The cameras quickly became one of the most popular movie cameras used around the world.
