= Joseph Jules Debrie =

French manufacturer of cinema camera and projectors

Joseph Jules Debrie was a French manufacturer of cinema camera and projectors, who founded Debrie.

His 1908 Parvo of 1908 was considered to be state-of-the-art at the time.
