= Reflex camera =

Camera with view through the main lens

Cross-section view of an SLR system, one of several systems by which reflex cameras are able to operate: 1: Front-mount lens (four-element Tessar design) 2: Reflex mirror at 45-degree angle 3: Focal plane shutter 4: Film or sensor 5: Focusing screen 6: Condenser lens 7: Optical glass pentaprism (or pentamirror) 8: Eyepiece (can have diopter correction ability)

A reflex camera is a camera that uses a mirror to reflect the image upwards to a ground glass screen, so that the image can be seen for focusing and framing. This permits the photographer to view the image that will be seen through the lens, and therefore to see exactly what will be captured, contrary to viewfinder cameras where the image could be significantly different from what will be captured, due to different optics, and optical path location which changes the perspective of the viewfinder.

== Variations ==
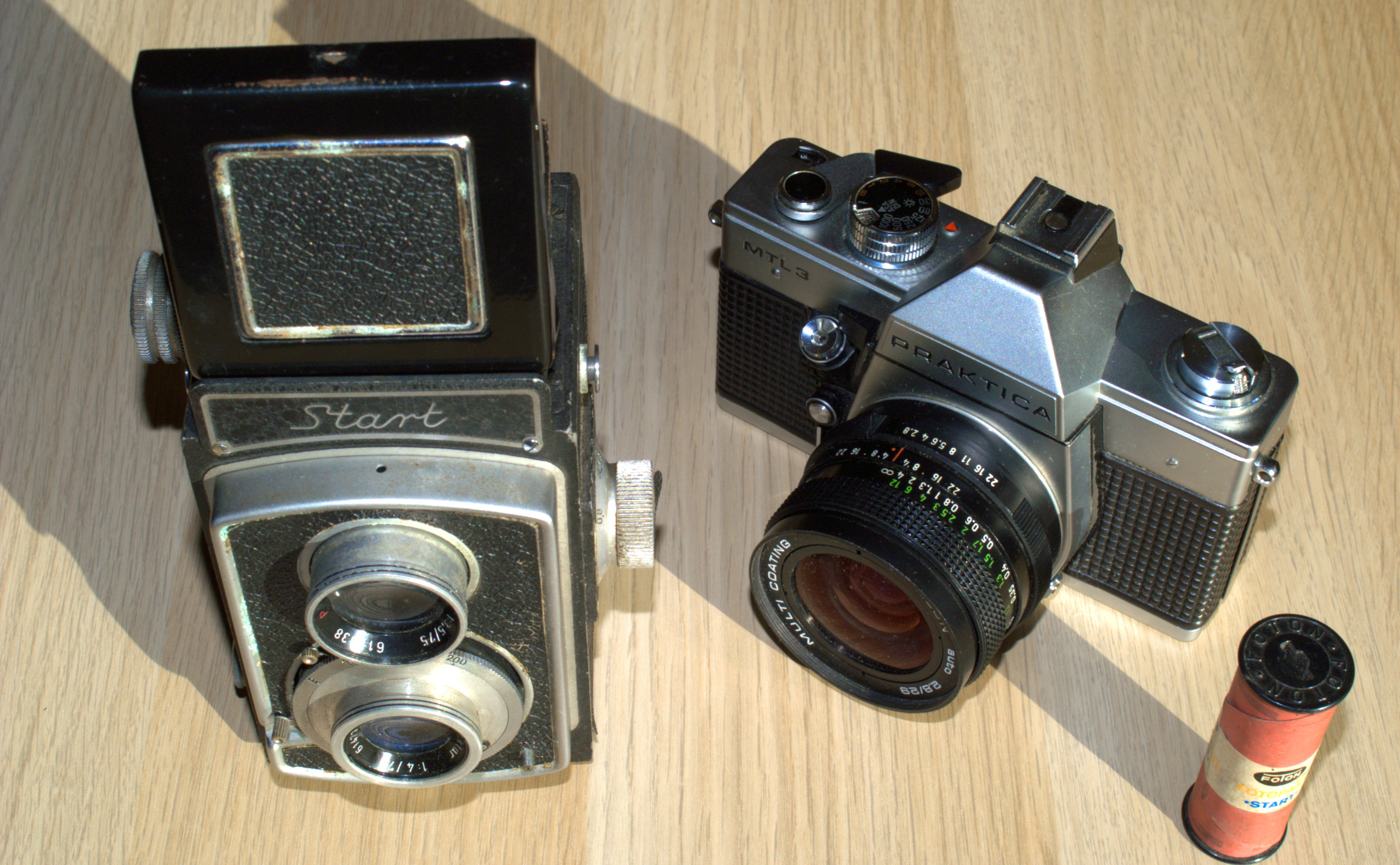

A single-lens reflex camera typically uses a mirror and prism system (hence "reflex", from the mirror's reflection) to accomplish this. The mirrorless interchangeable-lens camera achieves the same result by providing the photographer with a digitally captured image. The twin-lens reflex camera provides both a viewfinder image by reflecting the image onto ground glass and an image through another lens to the film. The image exposing the film is not reflected.

== See also ==
- single-lens reflex camera
- twin-lens reflex camera
