= Norman Hatch =

United States Marine

Major Norman Thomas Hatch
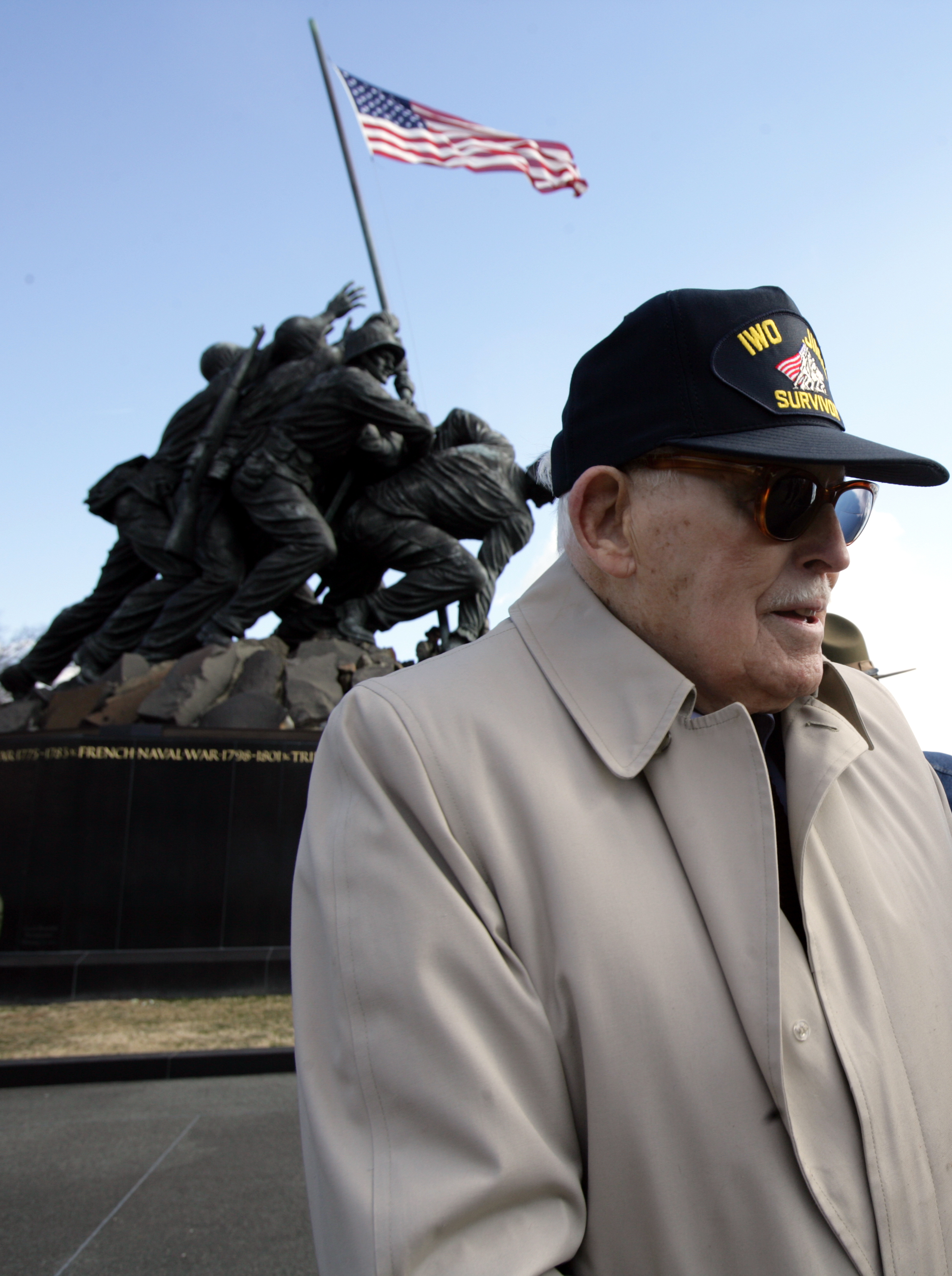
- Norman Hatch at the Marine Corps War Memorial following a flag raising ceremony commemorating the anniversary of the flag-raising at Iwo Jima (February 23, 2009)
- Born: March 2, 1921; Boston, Massachusetts
- Died: April 2, 2017 (aged 96); Alexandria, Virginia
- Burial place: Arlington National Cemetery
- Military career
- Branch: United States Marine Corps
- Service years: 1939–1946
- Rank: Major
- Conflicts: World War II: Battle of Tarawa
- Other work: U.S. Department of Defense (1946–1980)

Norman Thomas Hatch (March 2, 1921 – April 22, 2017) was a veteran of the U.S. Marine Corps who filmed much of the combat footage used in the documentary film With the Marines at Tarawa.

== Early life ==
Hatch was born in Boston, Massachusetts, and grew up in nearby Gloucester.

== Military service ==
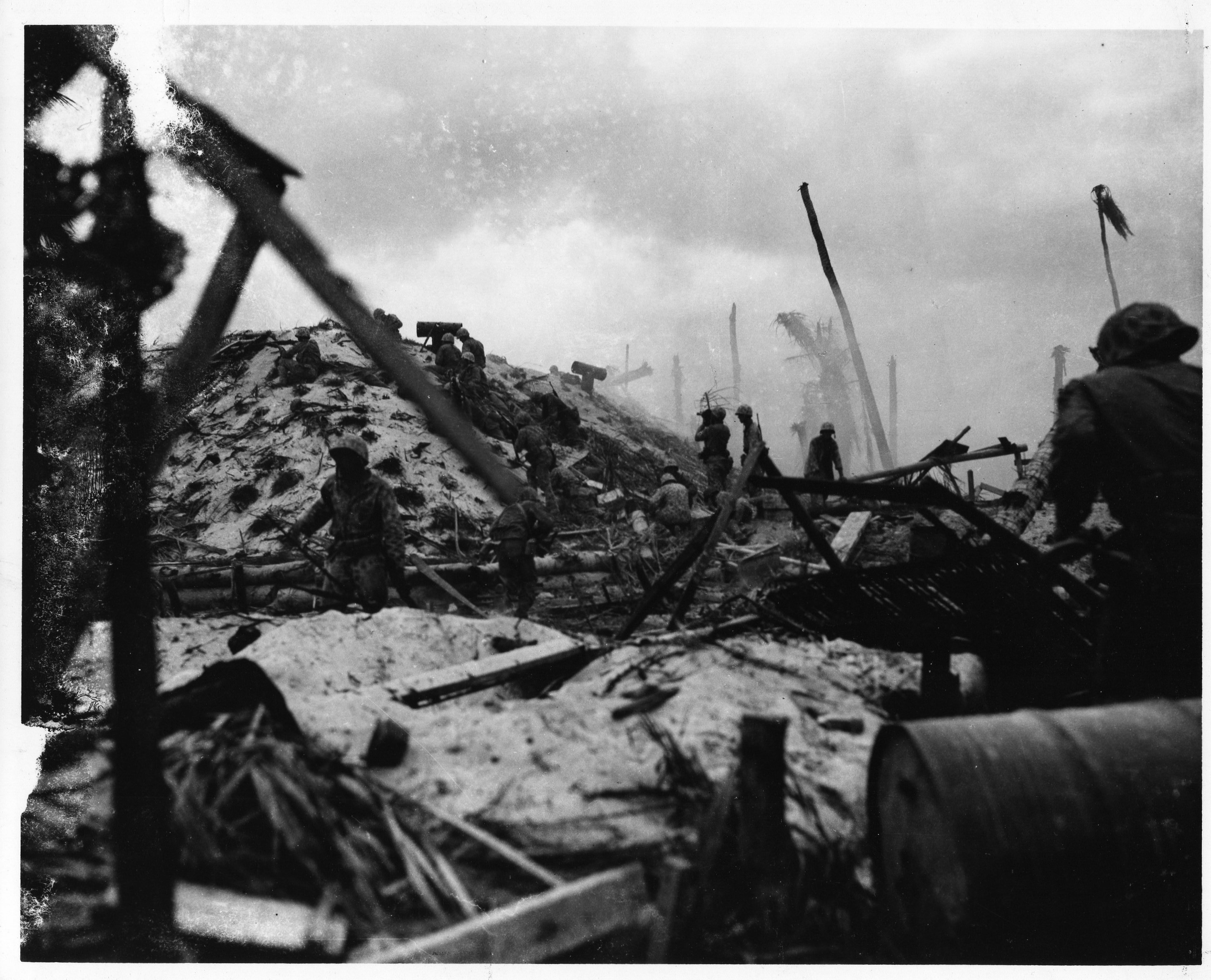
Hatch (center) photographing the action during the Battle of Tarawa in 1943

In 1939, Hatch joined the Marine Corps. Some of his cine films are now online; see External Links (below).

In November 1943, he was part of the Battle of Tarawa, and waded ashore with other Marines. Hatch used a Bell & Howell Eyemo to film the invasion and the ensuing combat.

== Civilian career ==
After the war, Hatch worked for the U.S. Department of Defense as a civilian from 1946 until 1980. He later opened and ran a photo agency, Photo Press International, for 21 years.
