= Filmo =

Filming equipment brand

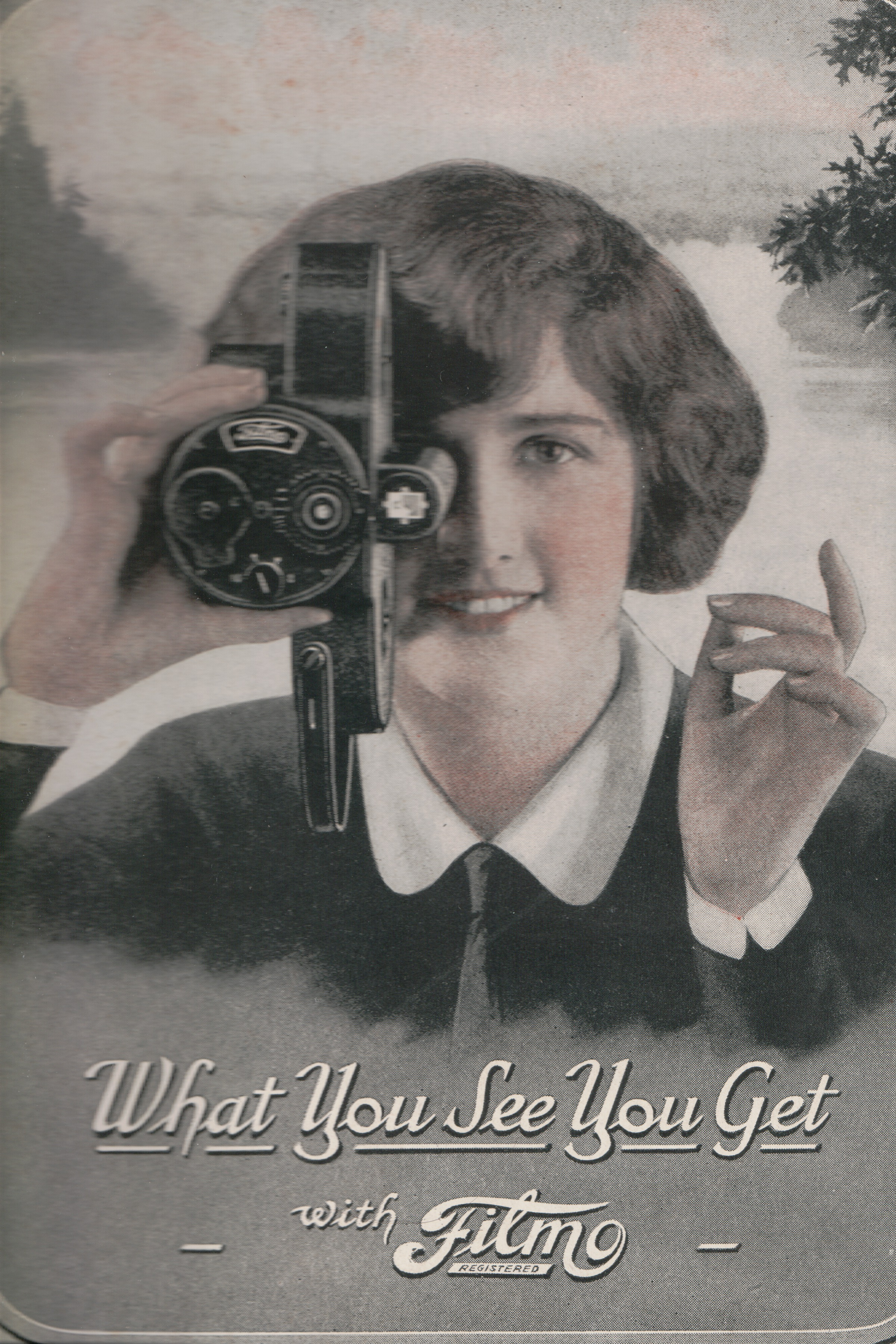
Cover for Filmo advertising booklet.

Bell & Howell Filmo is a series of 16 mm and 8 mm movie equipment made by the Bell & Howell Company. The line included cameras, projectors and accessories.

== History ==
The Filmo camera series started with the 1923 Filmo 70, beginning a series of models built on the same basic body that was to be continued for more than half a century. It was based on Bell & Howell's brilliantly designed 1917 prototype for a 17.5 mm camera intended for amateur use. When invited (along with Victor) into Kodak's 16 mm plans in 1920, the company was quick to see the advantages and immediately set about redesigning the 17.5 mm camera for 16mm film.

The Filmo 70 was the first spring motor-driven 16 mm camera. In 1925 the Eyemo, a hand-held 35 mm camera based on the design of the Filmo 70 was offered. It was also spring driven, but could be hand-cranked as well. Bell & Howell introduced the first 16 mm turret camera with its Model C in 1927. A beautifully ornate and much more compact 16mm camera, the Filmo 75, marketed primarily as a "watch-thin" ladies' camera, was offered in 1928, followed in 1931 by a nearly identical counterpart designated as the Filmo Field Camera, offered initially in a plain covering, but also available with the ornate decorations of the Model 75, and in that form indistinguishable from the earlier version except for the nameplate.

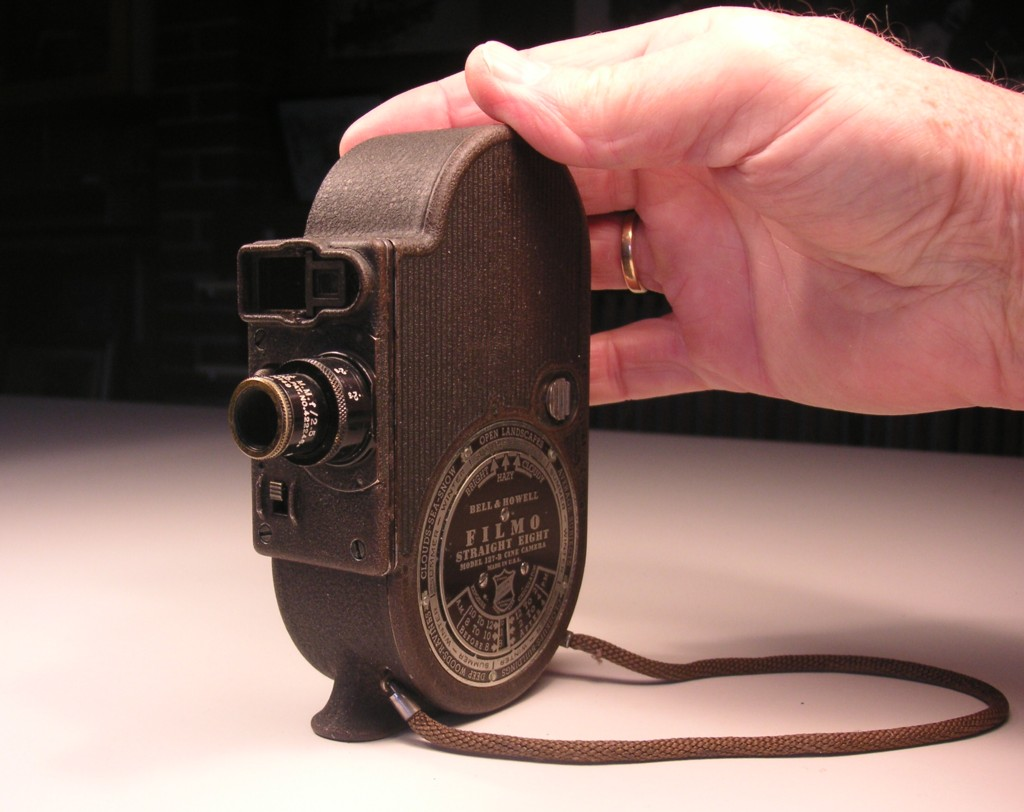
Bell & Howell 8 mm amateur camera Filmo Straight Eight

When Kodak introduced 8 mm film in 1932, Bell & Howell was slow to take up the new format, and when it did so, it was not in the form of the Kodak standard. The first 8 mm Filmo was offered in 1935 as a single run 8mm film camera, the Filmo 127-A called Straight Eight. However, Straight Eight did not appeal to the market as well as double-8, so the design was modified for double-8 as the 134-A in 1936. Production of Filmos around this body type continued into the 1950s.

== Description ==
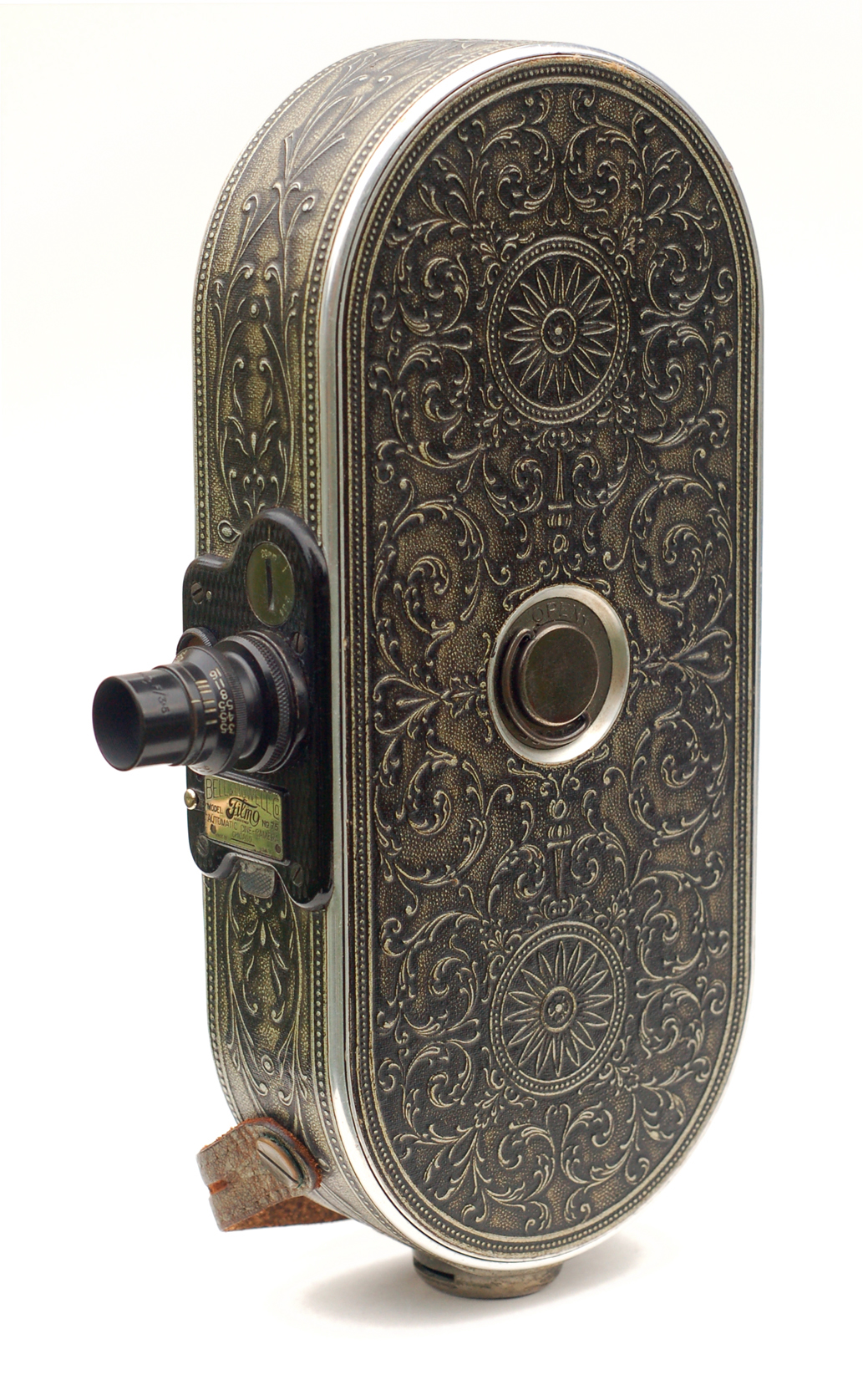
Ornate Filmo 75 camera (1928).

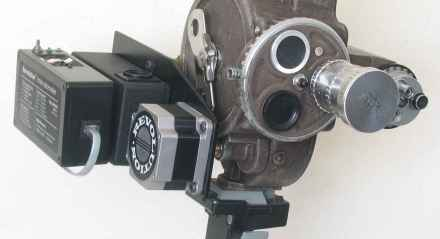
Filmo 70-DR with Crystal Sync Motor

The 16 mm Filmo cameras all take 16 mm film on a 100 ft (30 m) daylight spool, although some versions can also take 400 ft (120 m) external magazines.

Spring wind is standard, although some Filmos have provisions for attachment of a 12 V DC or AC motor. A crystal-sync motor was developed for the Eyemo and later adapted to the Filmo.

In 1927, the camera was equipped with a three-lens turret (Model C). Early turret models used a variable drum finder (Models D and DA) or sets of separate finder lenses matched to each focal length on later cameras (Models DL and DR).

Early versions (The Filmo 70A and 70C) were designed for two or three speeds, either 8-16 frame/s, 16-32 frame/s, 12-16-24 frame/s or 16-24-32 frame/s. Starting with the Model D in 1927, most versions could shoot a range of speeds up to 64 frames per second (8-12-16-24-32-48-64 frame/s), although there was a superspeed version, the 70-B (1925), designed to run at a single speed of 128 frame/s. This produced an extreme slow-motion effect and was used for motion analysis. The Model 70-E (1935) was a turretless version of the Model D, with a shorter range of speeds (8-16-24-64 frame/s).

The camera was built to the most precise standards in the industry, and is still popular with student filmmakers. Durable and ruggedly built, it was standard equipment for U.S. military combat cameramen from World War II through Vietnam, and the workhorse silent news-gathering camera for TV stations from the 1950s through the 1970s, when electronic news gathering (ENG) on video tape began to replace 16 mm film. Most varieties are very common, but special models like the Model 70-B, and the 70-DB (Golf Model, 1931) are quite rare, and the Filmo 70-AC Morgana Color System camera (1932), while advertised briefly, is unknown in any extant examples and may never have gone past the prototype stage.
