= Parvo (camera) =

35mm motion picture camera

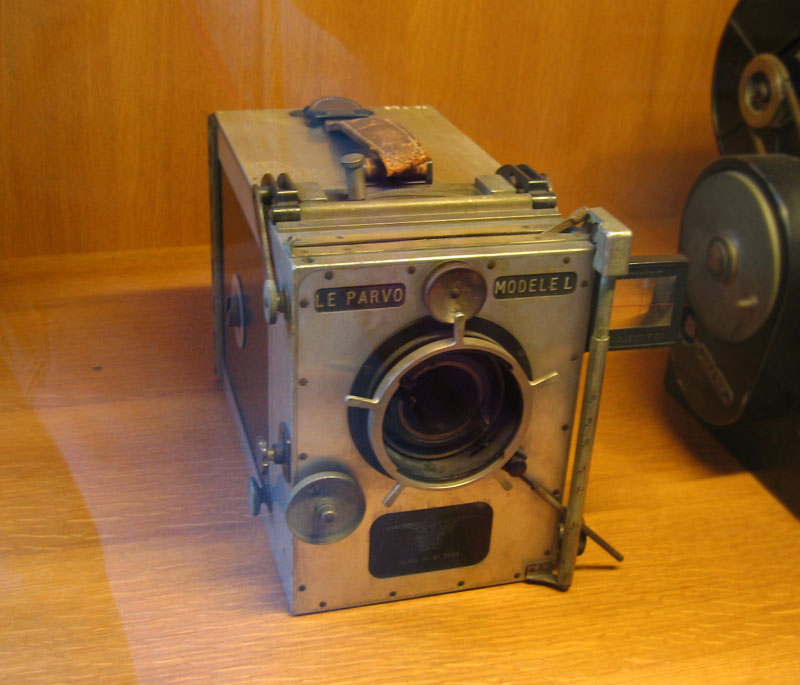

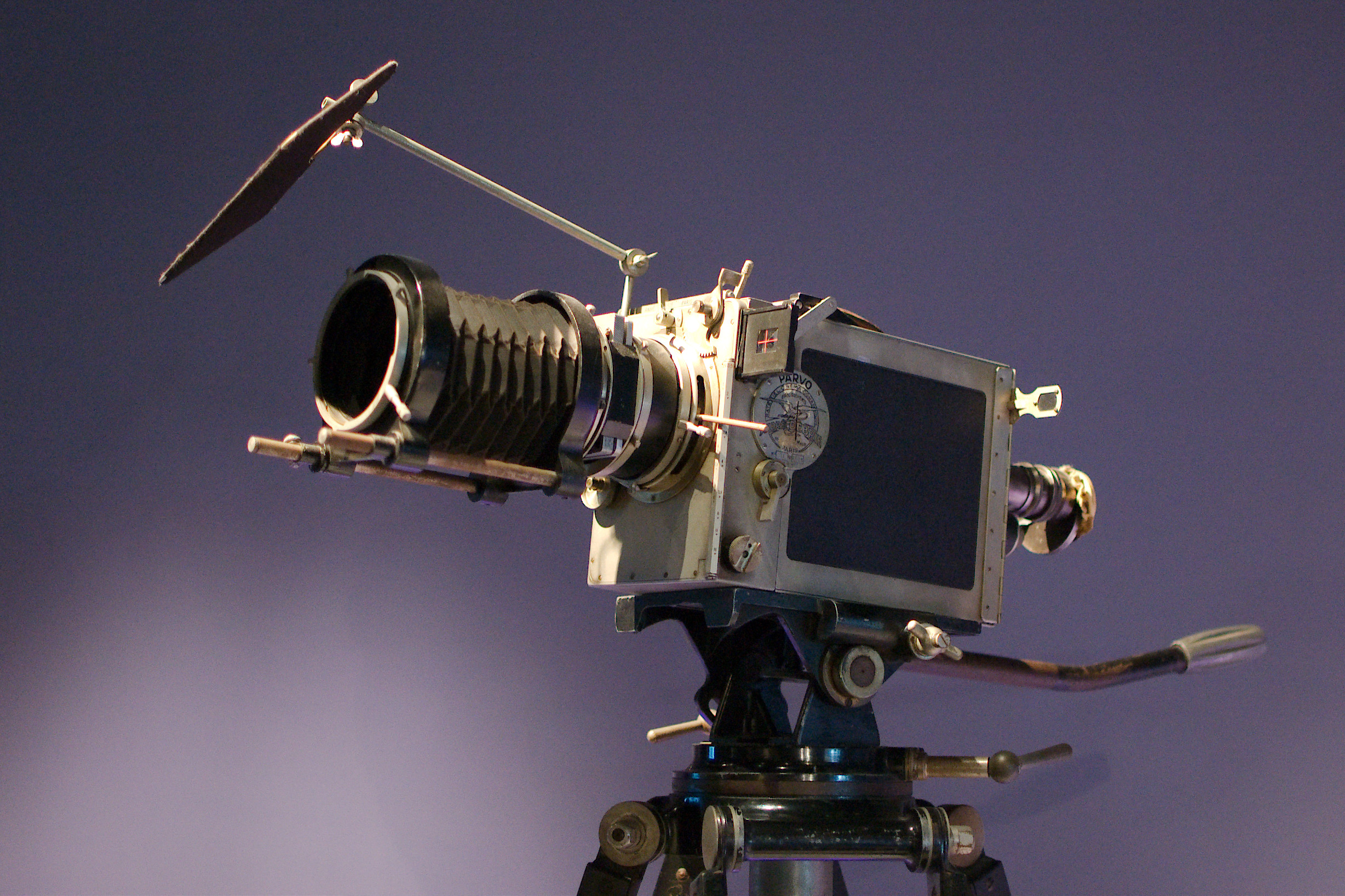
A Model L Parvo from 1927

The Parvo was a 35mm motion picture camera developed in France by André Debrie. The patent was registered in 1908 by his father, Joseph Dules Debrie. The camera was relatively compact for its time. It was hand-cranked, as were its predecessors. To aid the camera operator in cranking at the correct speed, the camera had a built in tachometer.

The Parvo held up to 120 metres (390 ft) of film inside without the need for an external film magazine, yielding almost 6 minutes of film when cranked at the standard 16 frames per second silent film rate. It allowed the camera operator to focus the camera lens but – as all other cine cameras of its era – had a side optical viewfinder to be used during actual filming.

The Parvo was immensely popular in Europe during the silent film era, straight through the 1920s. Directors who relied on the camera included Dziga Vertov, Abel Gance, Leni Riefenstahl, and Sergei Eisenstein. The latter's cinematographer, Eduard Tisse, would use the camera into the sound era, i.e. filming the duelling sequence in Alexander Nevsky. Vertov animated a Debrie Parvo as mechanical protagonist and used it to make several hand-held sequences in his 1929 documentary, Man with a Movie Camera.
