= Bell & Howell =

American services company and former manufacturer of film machinery

Bell and Howell

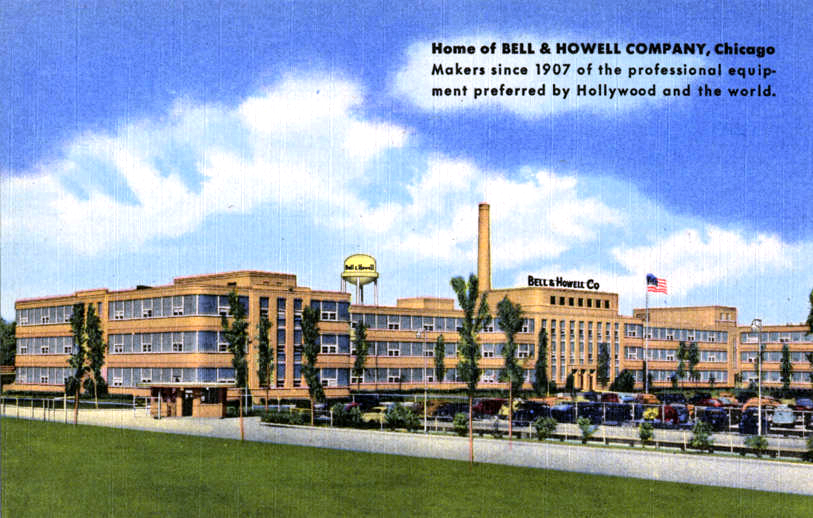
- Original headquarters in Chicago
- Type: Brand
- Industry: Cameras, lenses, and motion picture machinery
- Founded: February 17, 1907; 119 years ago in Chicago, Illinois
- Founder: Albert S. Howell
- Headquarters: Durham, North Carolina, U.S.
- Website: www.bellhowell.net

Bell and Howell is an American brand of cameras, lenses, and motion picture machinery. It was originally founded as a company in 1907, and headquartered in Durham, North Carolina. The company was acquired by Böwe Systec in 2003. Since 2010, the brand name has been licensed for a variety of consumer electronics products not produced by Bell & Howell.

== History ==
1970s logo

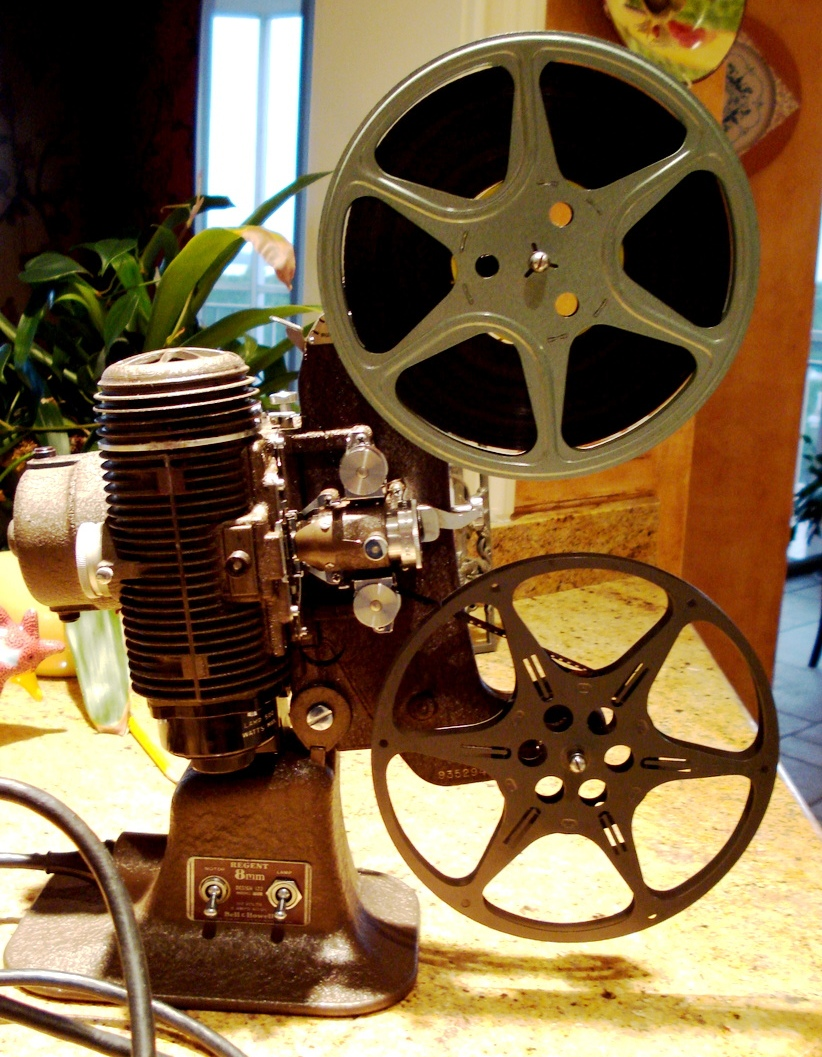
A Bell & Howell "Regent" 8mm home projector

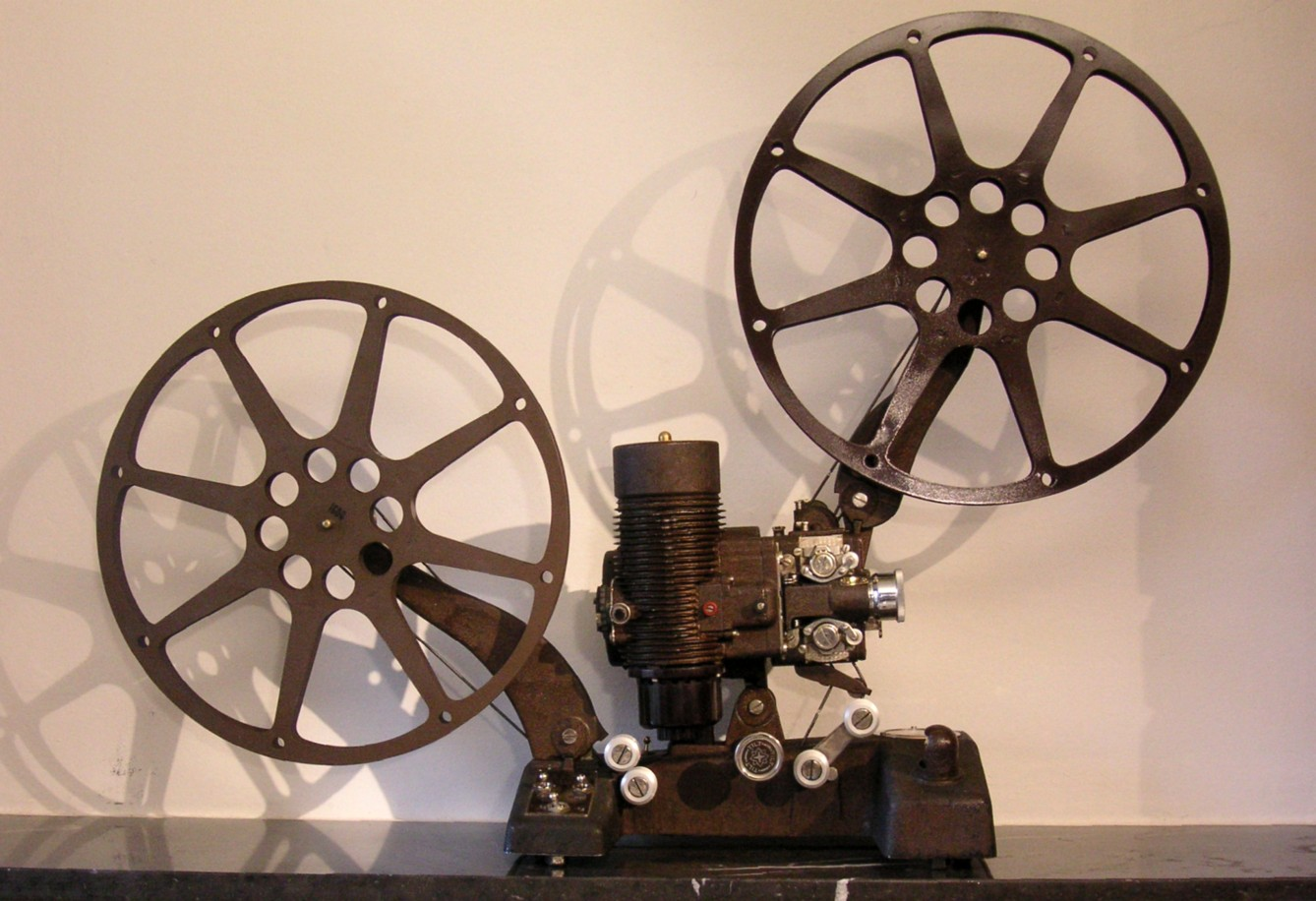
Bell & Howell 16mm silent film projector Filmo 129

Operating the Bell & Howell Filmo 129 16mm projector

According to its charter, the Bell & Howell Company was incorporated on February 17, 1907. It was recorded in the Cook County Record Book eight days later. The first meeting of stockholders took place in the office of Attorney W. G. Strong on February 19. The first board of directors was chosen for a term of one year: Donald Joseph Bell (1869–1934), chairman; Albert Summers Howell (1879–1951), secretary; and Marguerite V. Bell (wife of Donald Bell), vice chairman.

The firm made products for the motion picture industry. The Bell & Howell 2709 was the first all metal, commercially available motion picture camera. The 2709 was so expensive that only Charlie Chaplin and three other people owned one, while the rest were owned by studios.

Bell & Howell introduced products that improved the quality of projected images in a movie theater. The Kinodrome 35-mm projector mechanism, introduced in 1907, steadied projected images and reduced the flicker that can occur during motion-picture projection. The 35-mm perforator, introduced in 1910, set the standard throughout the industry as to the expected distance and width of the sprocket holes running on each side of the 35-mm film; before this there had been no agreed upon standard.

Bell & Howell developed a continuous film printing process in 1911, that was gradually accepted across the film printing industry.

Historically, Bell & Howell Co. was an important supplier of many different media technologies, and it produced products such as:

- Newsreel and amateur film cameras such as the Filmo (end of 1923) and Eyemo (1925), and Autoload EE (1956)
- Military Gun sight TYPE N-8
- Regular-8 and Super-8 film cameras and projectors (all models)
- 16mm silent and sound projectors (all models)
- Slide projectors (2" × 2"; 5 cm x 5 cm)
- 35mm filmstrip projectors
- Overhead presentation projectors (all models)
- Stereo cameras and stereo slide projectors through its TDC subsidiary
- Slide Cube Projector, circa 1970

In 1934, Bell & Howell introduced their first amateur 8mm movie projector, in 1935 the Filmo Straight Eight camera, and in 1936 the Double-Run Filmo 8. The 1938 Kodak cassette holding 25 feet (7.6 m) of Double-Eight film was taken by the Filmo Auto-8 in 1940.

The firm added microfilm products in 1946. In 1954, Bell & Howell purchased DeVry Industries' 16mm division.

Although known for manufacturing their film projectors, a partnership with Canon between 1961 and 1976 offered still cameras. Many of their 35mm SLR cameras were manufactured by Canon with the Bell & Howell logo or Bell & Howell/Canon in place of the Canon branding. The firm dropped the production of movie cameras by the end of the 1970s.

Bell & Howell was a supplier of media equipment for schools and offices. The film laboratory line is now a separate company, BHP Inc, which is a division of Research Technology International.

In 1960, Bell & Howell merged with an Electronics and Instrumentation company CEC, Lennox Road, Basingstoke, UK. This facility produced pressure transducers and other devices for applications in areas such as North Sea oil platforms, the chemical industry, and the Ariane Space vehicles. This division was divested to Transamerica Corporation in 1983.

In 1977, Bell & Howell signed an agreement with BASF to develop a new amateur videotape recorder, which would have made use of a 6.25 millimetres (0.246 in) tape on which 28 of parallel tracks were to be recorded with the aid of a fixed head. The machine was expected to be ready by Christmas 1979, but did not reach the market. Bell & Howell purchased University Microfilms International in the 1980s. UMI produced a product called ProQuest.

In the 2000s, Bell & Howell decided to focus on their information technology businesses. The imaging business was sold to Eastman Kodak, and the international mail business was sold to Pitney Bowes. On June 6, 2001, Bell & Howell became a ProQuest Company, which was then a publicly traded company, but is now a subsidiary of the private Cambridge Information Group. In September 2001, the remaining industrial businesses along with the Bell & Howell name were sold to private equity firm Glencoe Capital.

The company merged with the North American arm of Böwe Systec Inc. Later, in 2003, Böwe Systec acquired the entire company. The company was known as Böwe Bell & Howell until 2011, when Versa Capital Management bought the company out of bankruptcy and renamed the company "Bell and Howell, LLC".

In 2010 consumer electronics manufacturer Elite Brands licensed the Bell + Howell brand name to use on optical and imaging products including digital cameras and camcorders, binoculars, telescopes, lenses, and various camera accessories. BHH, LLC has also expanded licensing of the Bell + Howell brand name for a range of products including lighting and security, personal care, tools, pest control, auto accessories and luggage. Bell & Howell doesn't produce any of the items using its trade name.

In 2011 a digital video recorder was released featuring the Bell + Howell brand.

In 2017 the company spun off the mail sorting business, including vote by mail, to Fluence Automation, which was then acquired by BlueCrest Inc. in 2021. BlueCrest had acquired the Pitney-Bowes document messaging business in 2018.

In December 2018, Versa Capital announced the successful closing of the sale of Bell and Howell to Boston-based WestView Capital Partners.

== Apple II ==
Bell & Howell marketed a specially designed Apple II Plus computer to the educational market beginning in July 1979. The modified Apple had additional security elements for classroom use such as a tamper-proof cover. The case color was black but the inside was a standard Apple II Plus. The modified Apple II became known colloquially among computer enthusiasts as the "Darth Vader" Apple II for its black case design.

== Education Group ==
Bell & Howell founded an Education Group within the company in 1907. This Education Group created Bell & Howell Schools in 1966. In that same year, the Education Group purchased a controlling share of DeVry Institute of Technology. Two years later in 1968, Bell & Howell's Education Group, via a controlling interest in DeVry, acquired Ohio Institute of Technology in Columbus, Ohio. Over the years, the Education Group has bought and sold large interests in a variety of educational organizations and institutions, including Heathkit which supplied electronics kits for Bell & Howell courses.

== Gallery ==
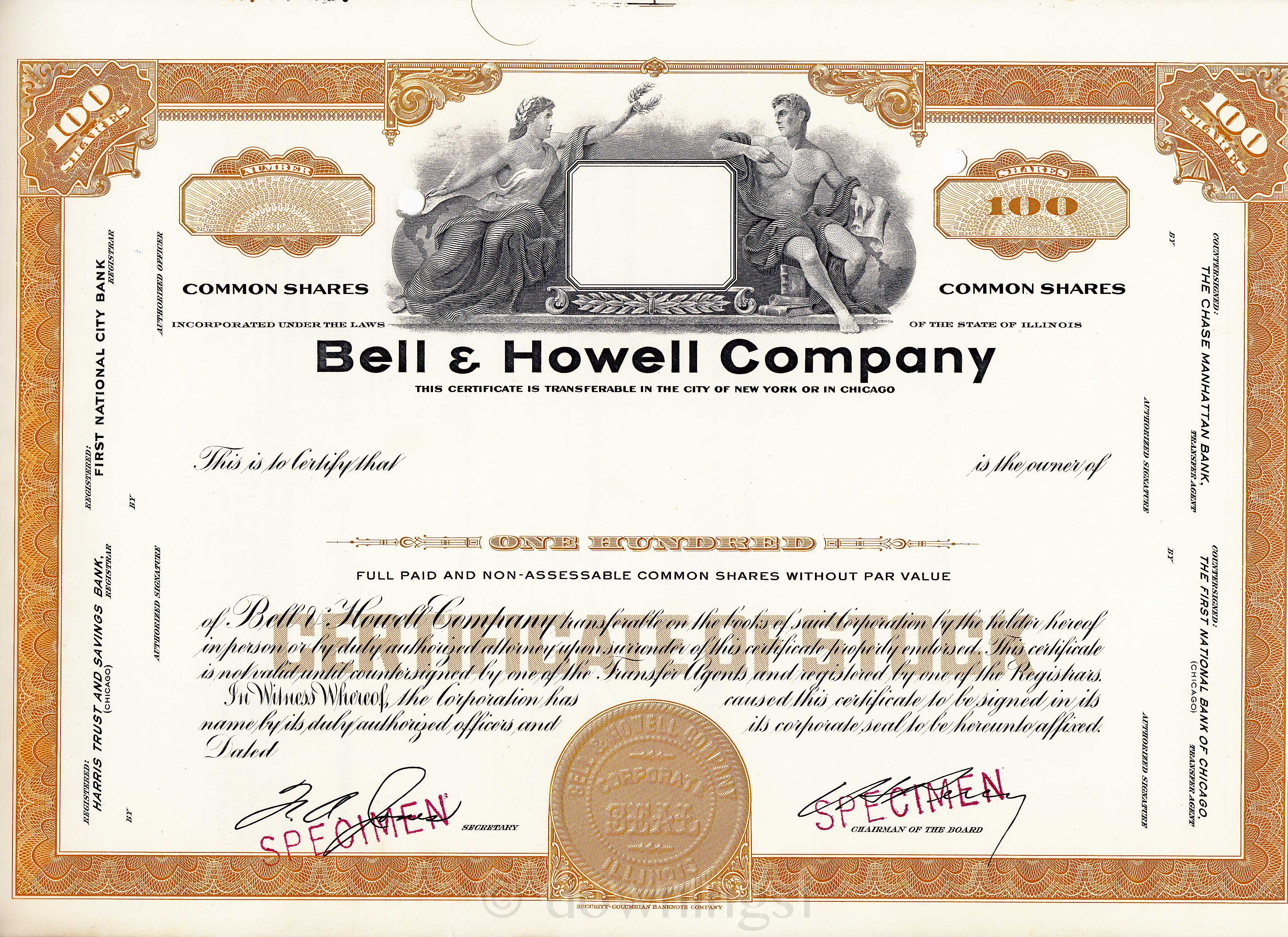
Specimen stock certificate

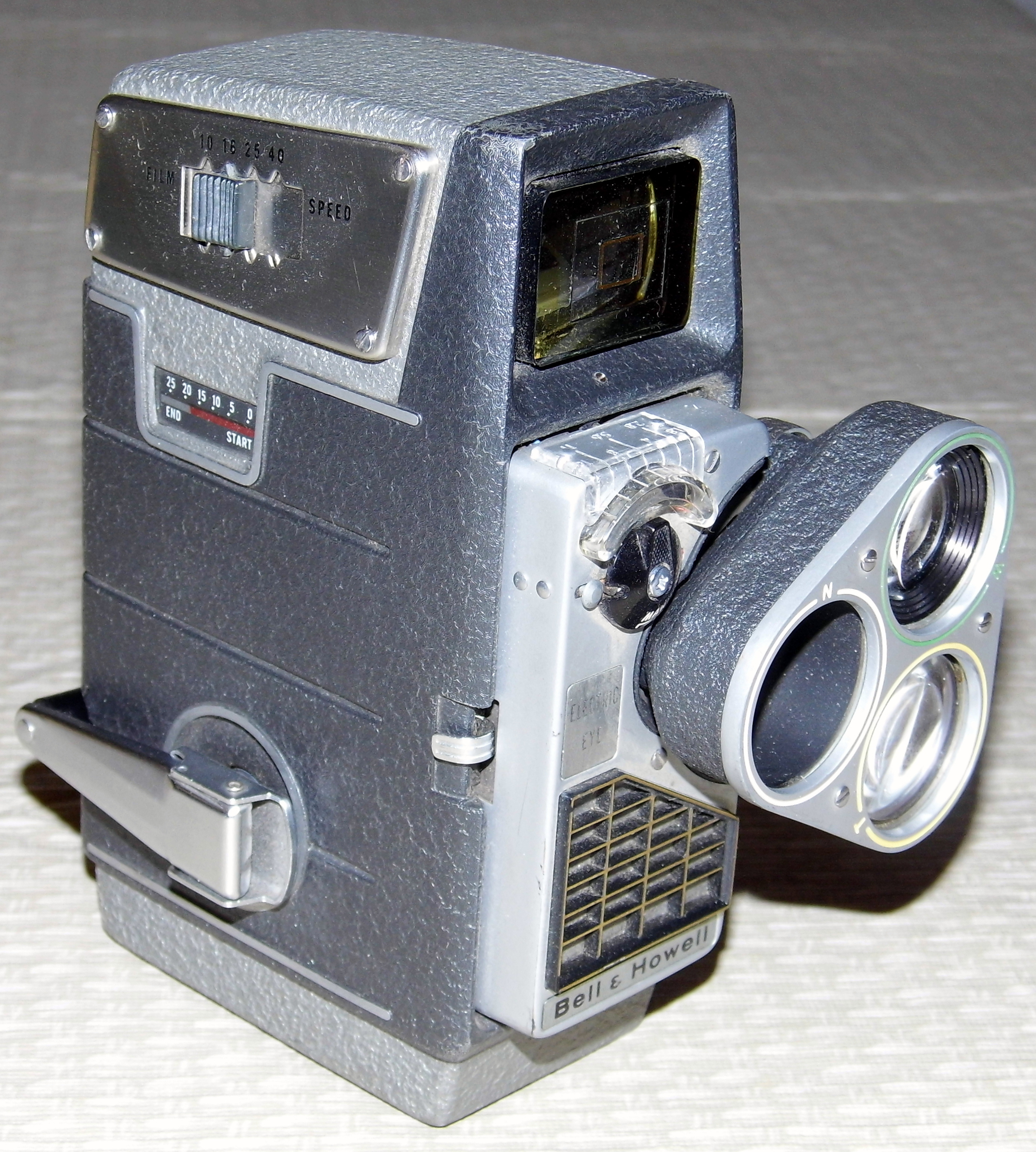
8mm Movie Camera with Electric Eye

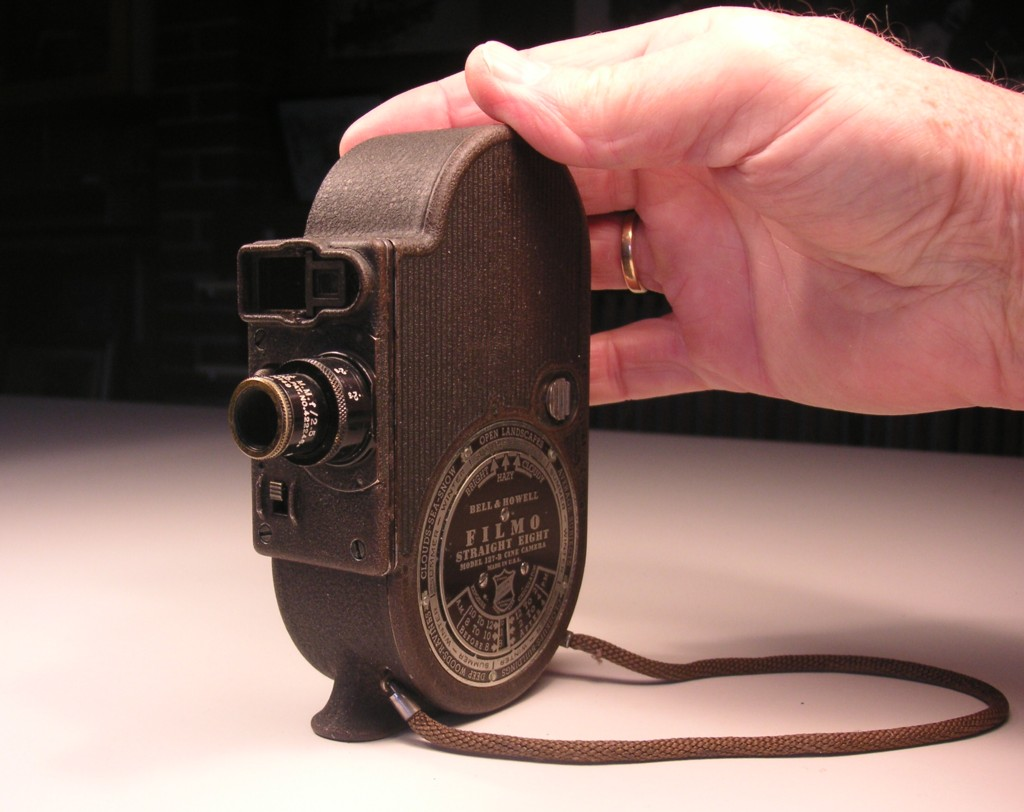
Bell & Howell 8mm amateur camera Filmo Straight Eight

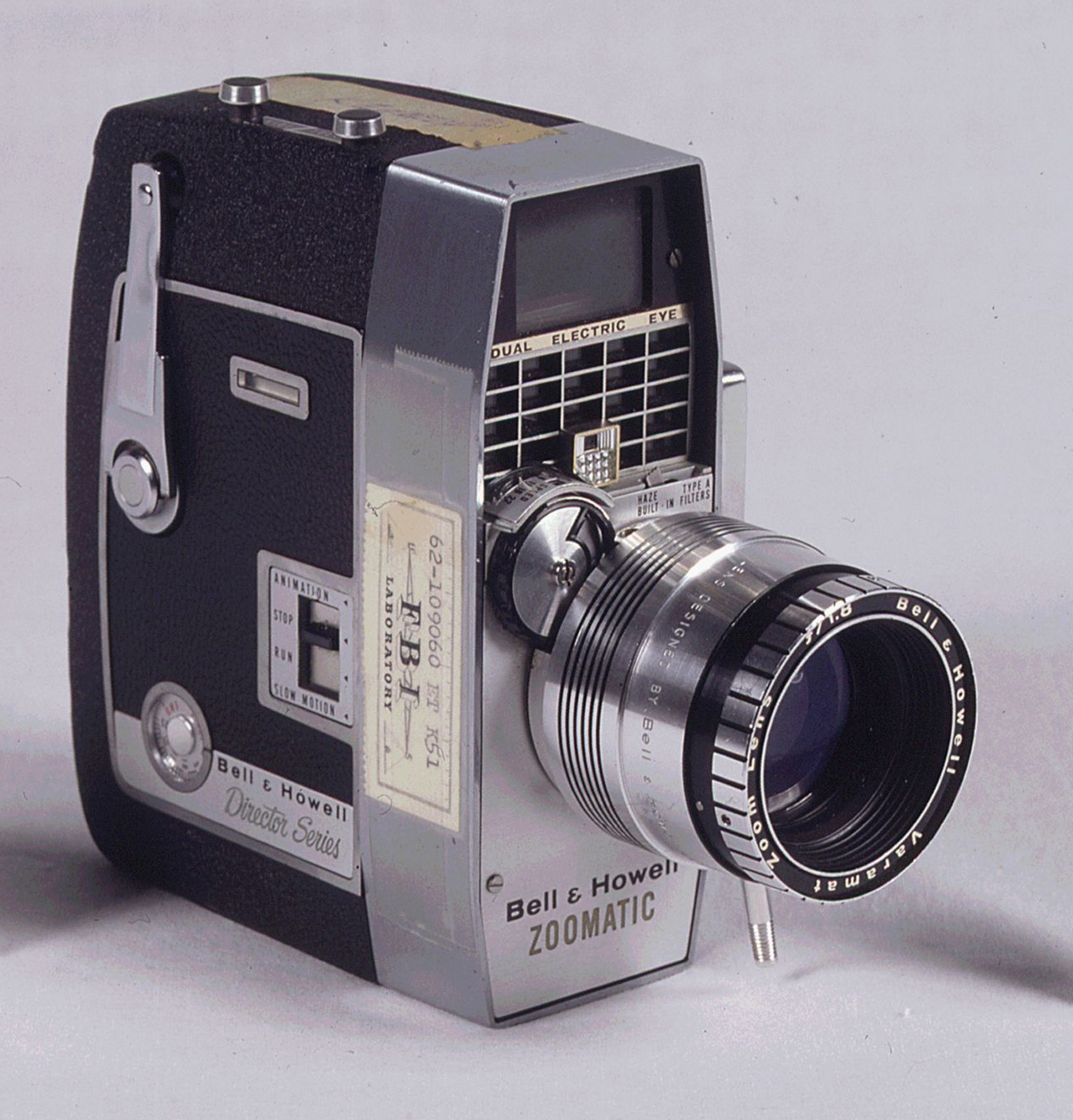
Bell & Howell Zoomatic movie camera used to shoot the Zapruder film, in the collection of the U.S. National Archives

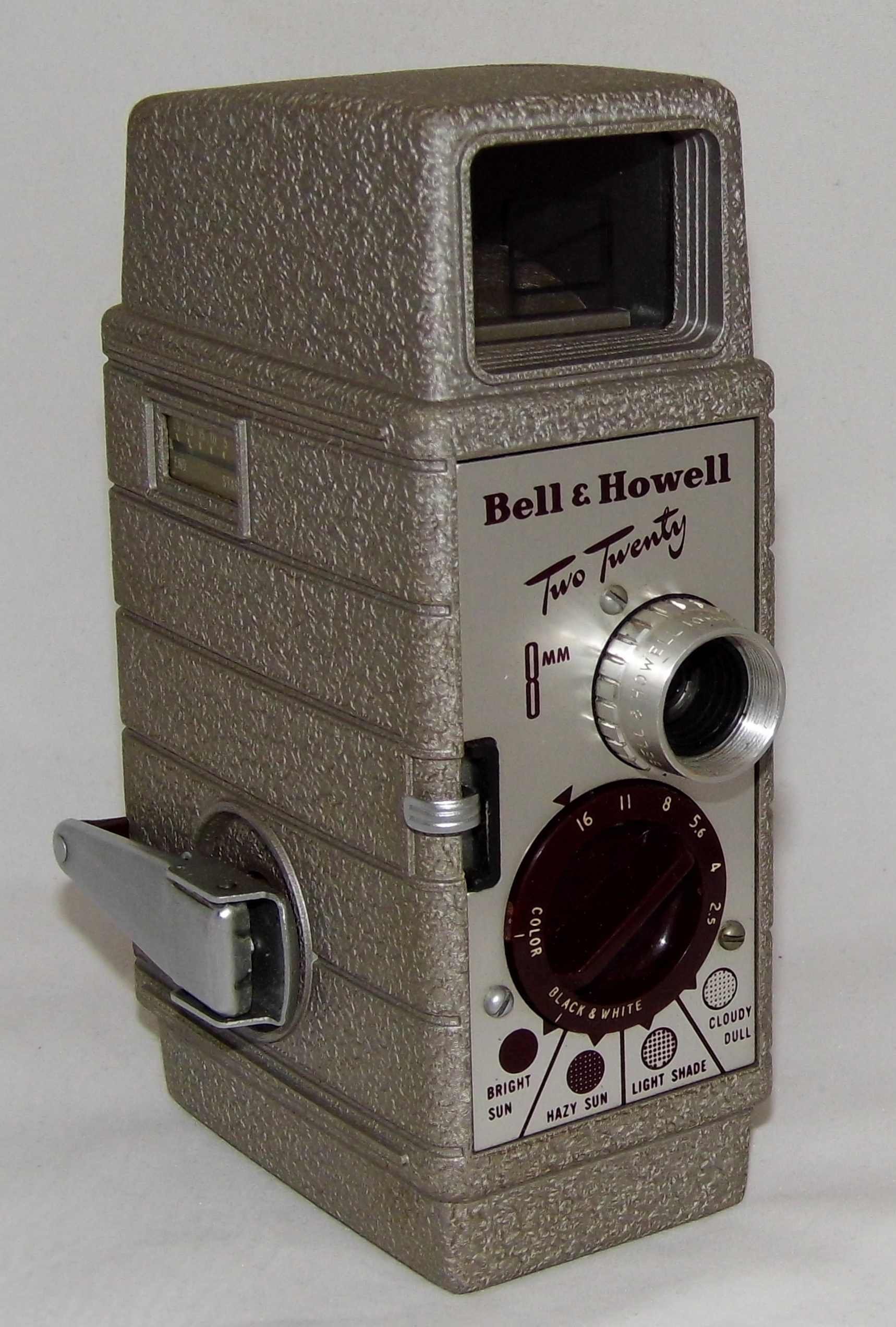
Bell & Howell 8mm home movie camera, model Two Twenty

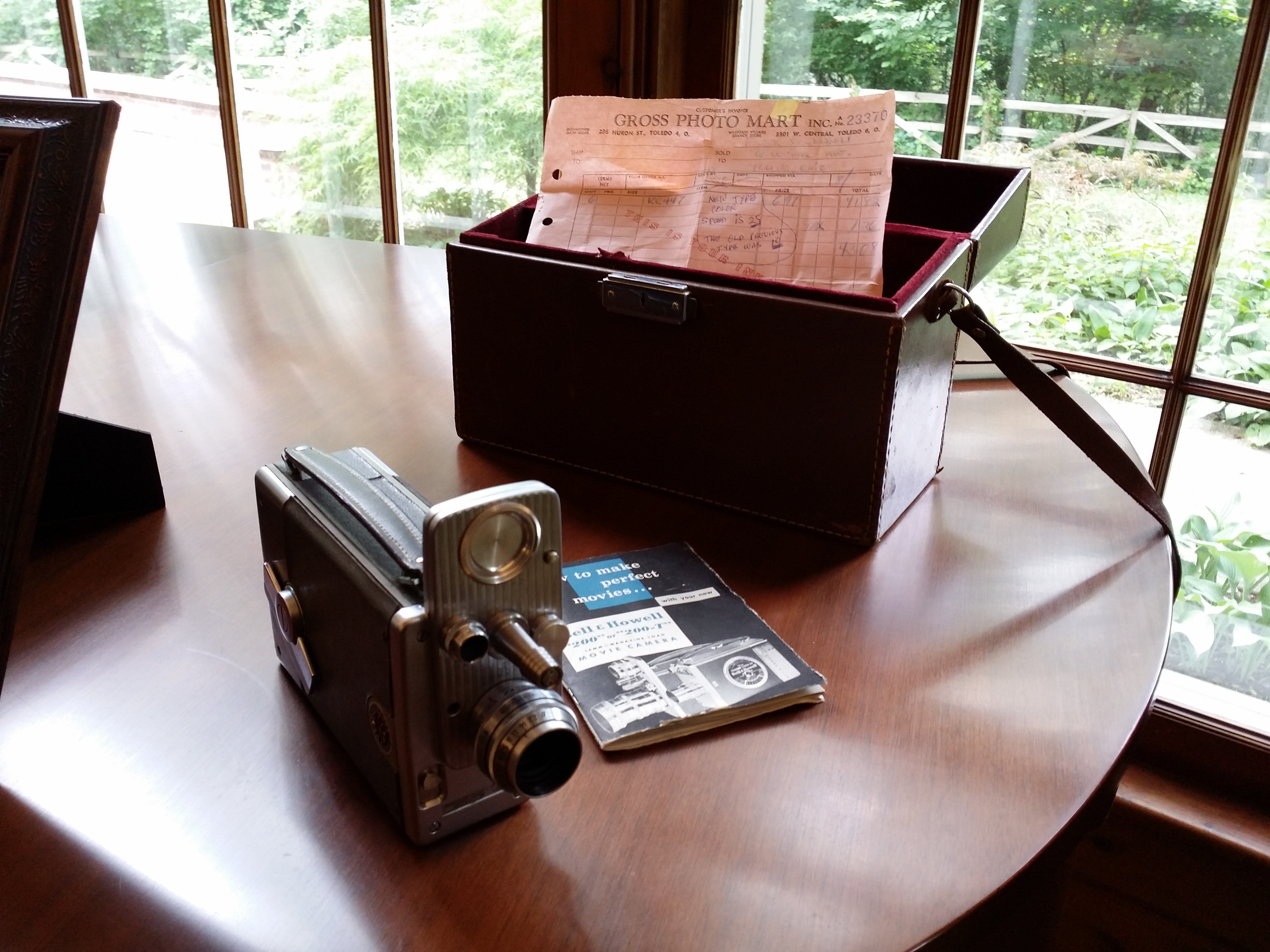
Bell & Howell 200 Movie Camera

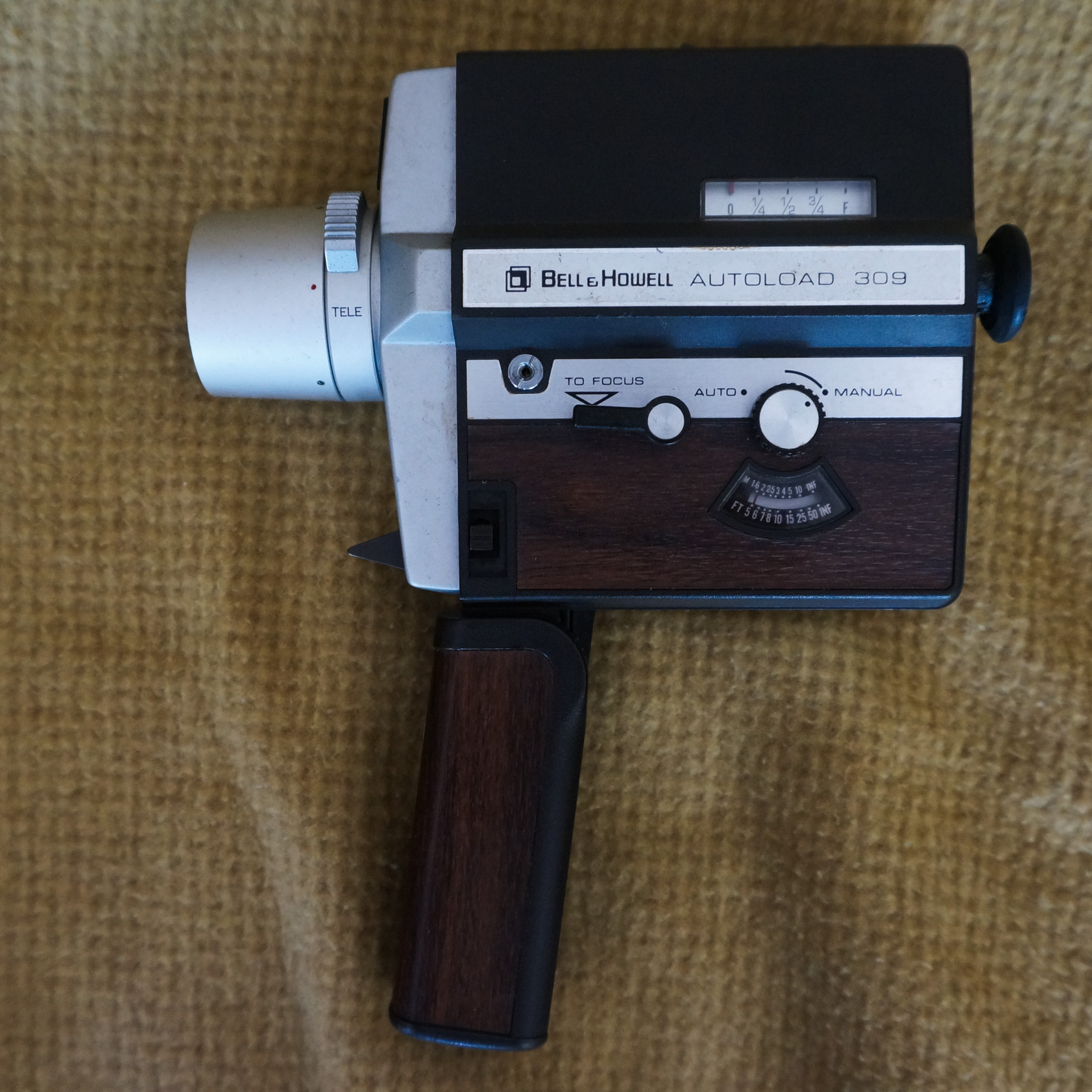
Bell & Howell Autoload 309 Super 8 Camera

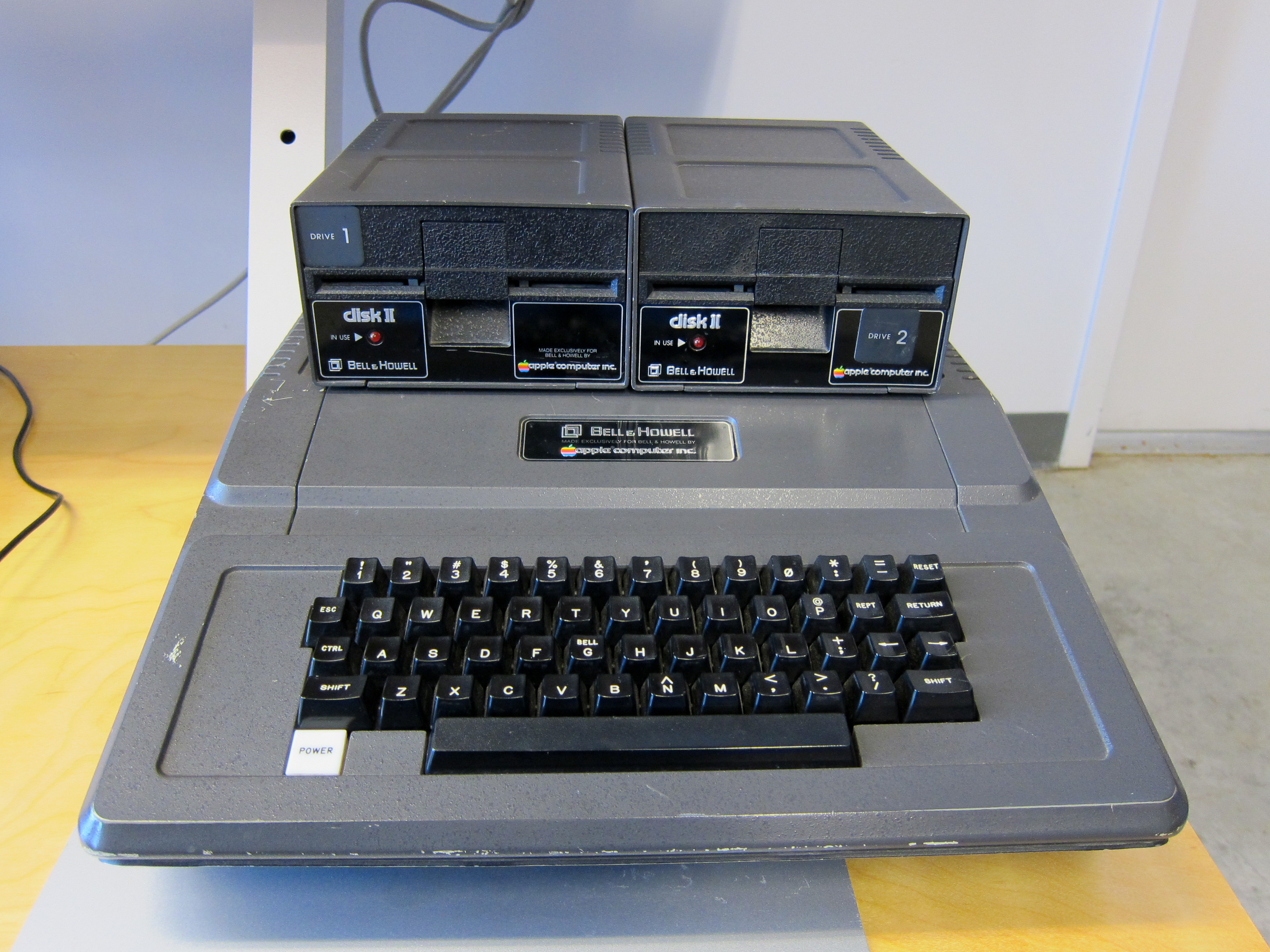
Educational version of Apple II computer

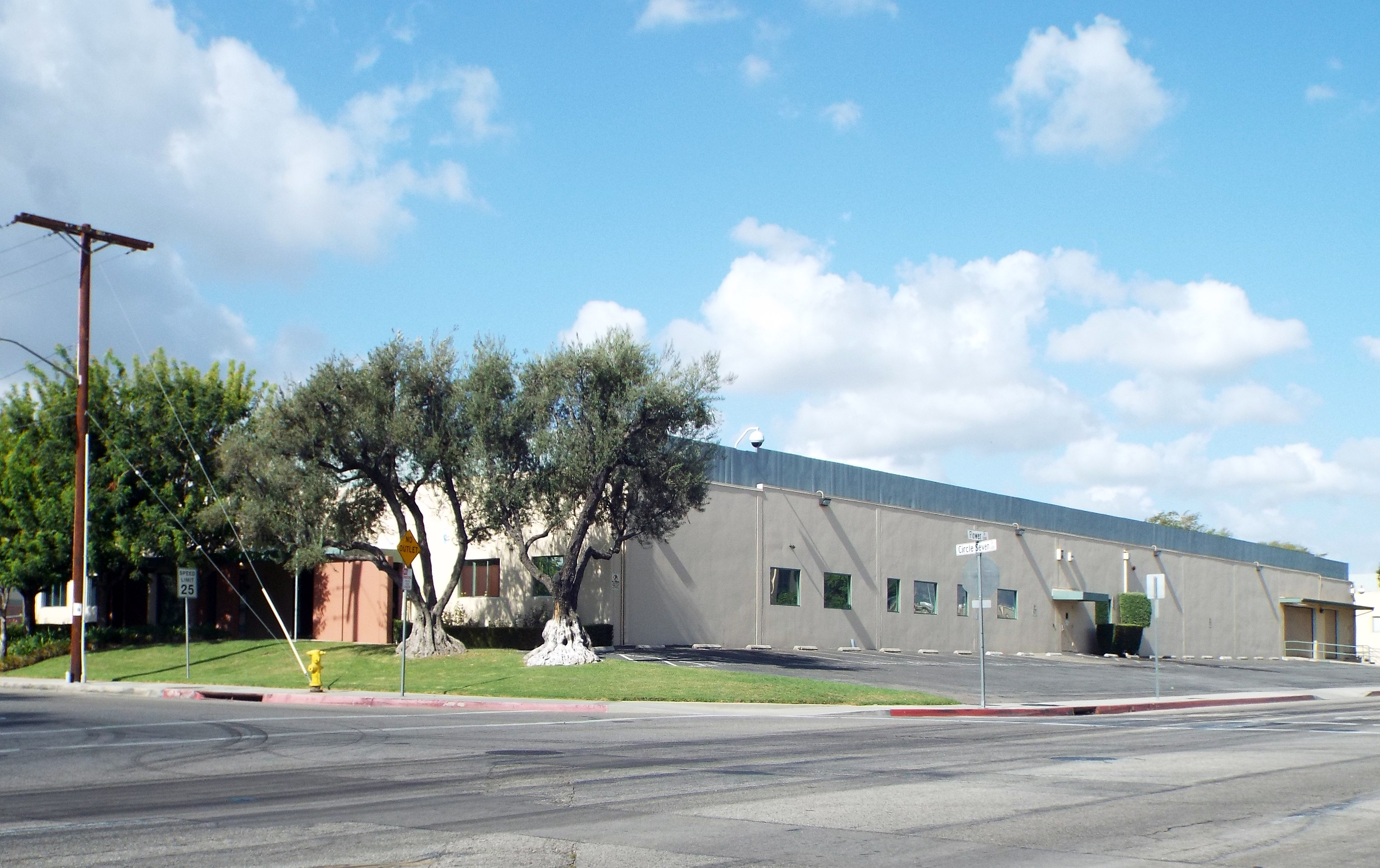
Bell & Howell's former western United States regional headquarters at 623 Circle Seven Drive (formerly 623 Rodier Drive) in Glendale, California

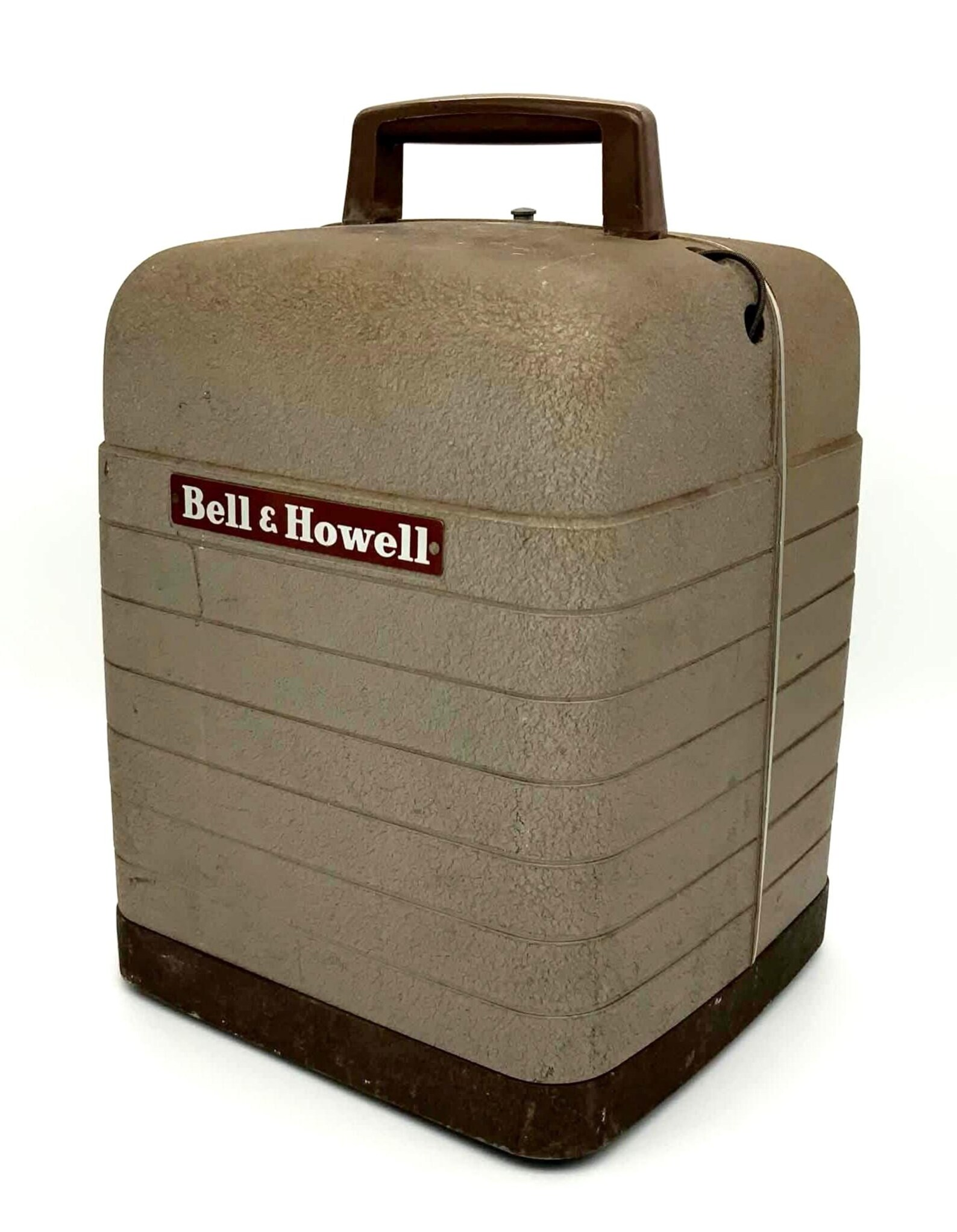
1950s Bell & Howell Monterey 8mm movie projector, Model 253-A, shown closed in its original industrial carrying case.

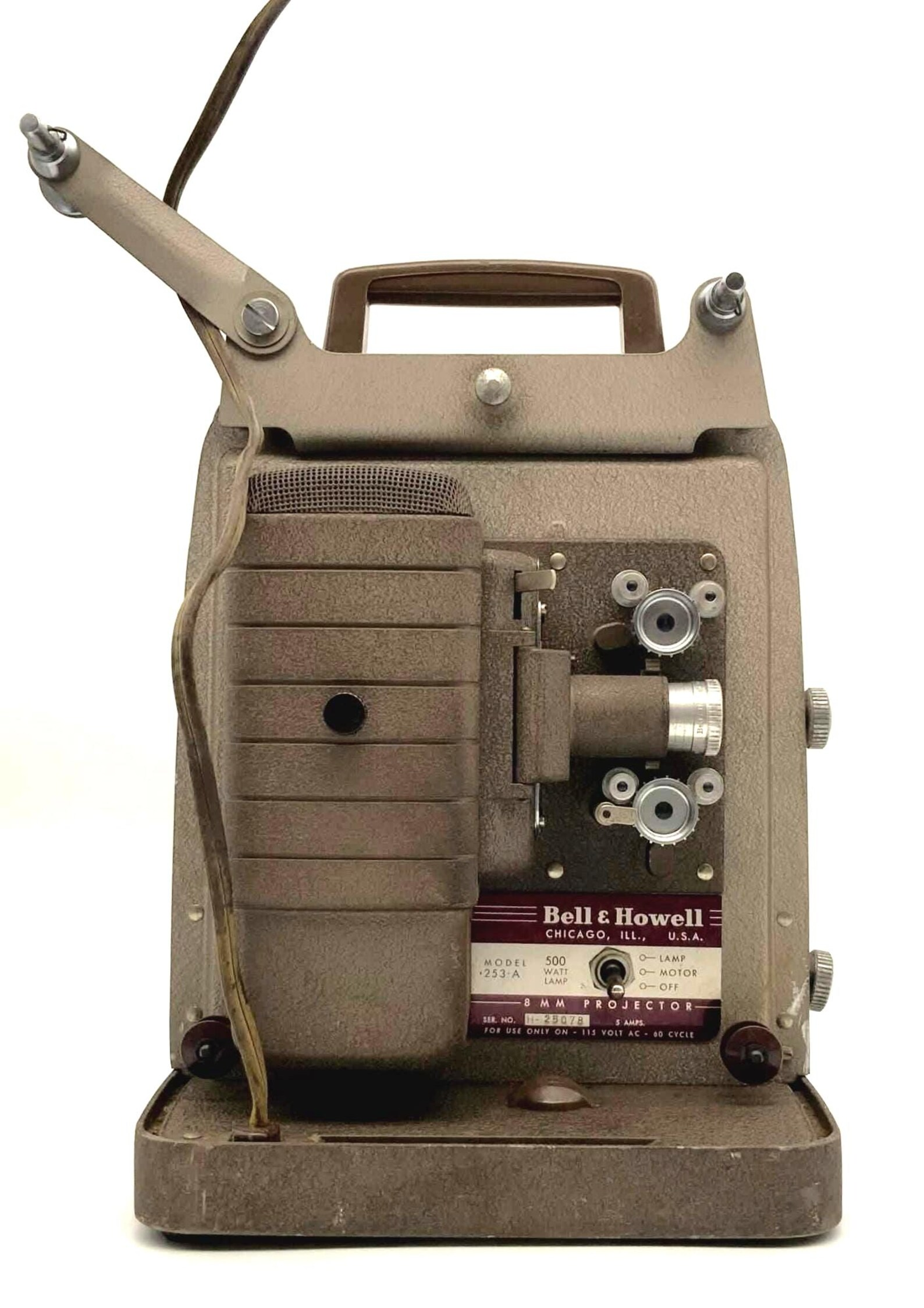
A 1950s Bell & Howell Monterey 8mm movie projector, Model 253-A. Features a tan crinkle finish and industrial Mid-Century Modern design. Tested and fully functional.

== See also ==
- Charles H. Percy
- BH Film perforation
- TeleMation Inc. In 1977, TeleMation inc. became a division of Bell and Howell.
- Pocket comparator
- Gordon Bradt
