= Gordon Bradt =

American inventor, designer (1924–2022)

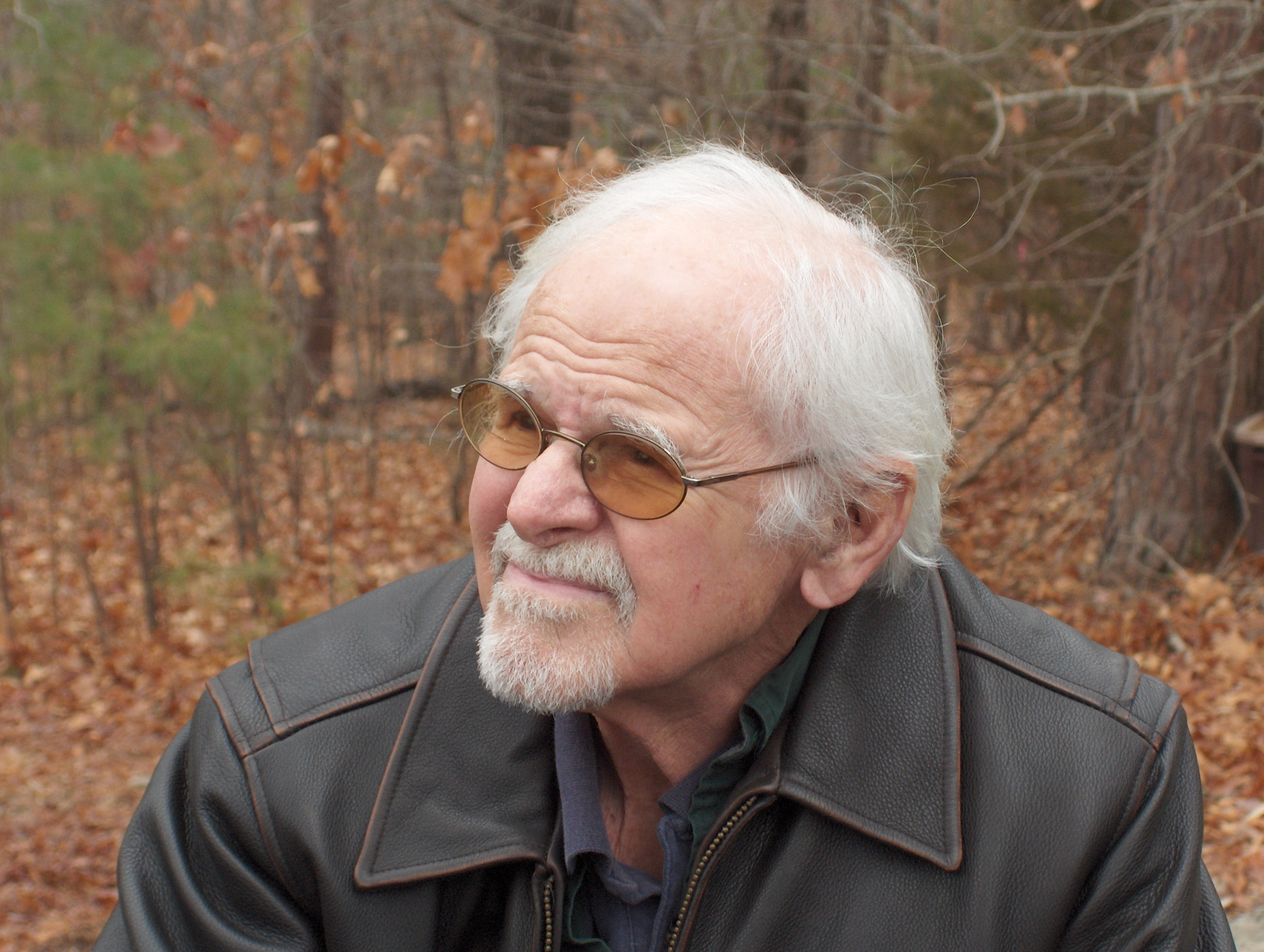
Bradt in 2005

Gordon Edwin Bradt (May 2, 1924 – December 3, 2022) was an American inventor, designer and the founder of Kinetico Studios.

== Early life ==
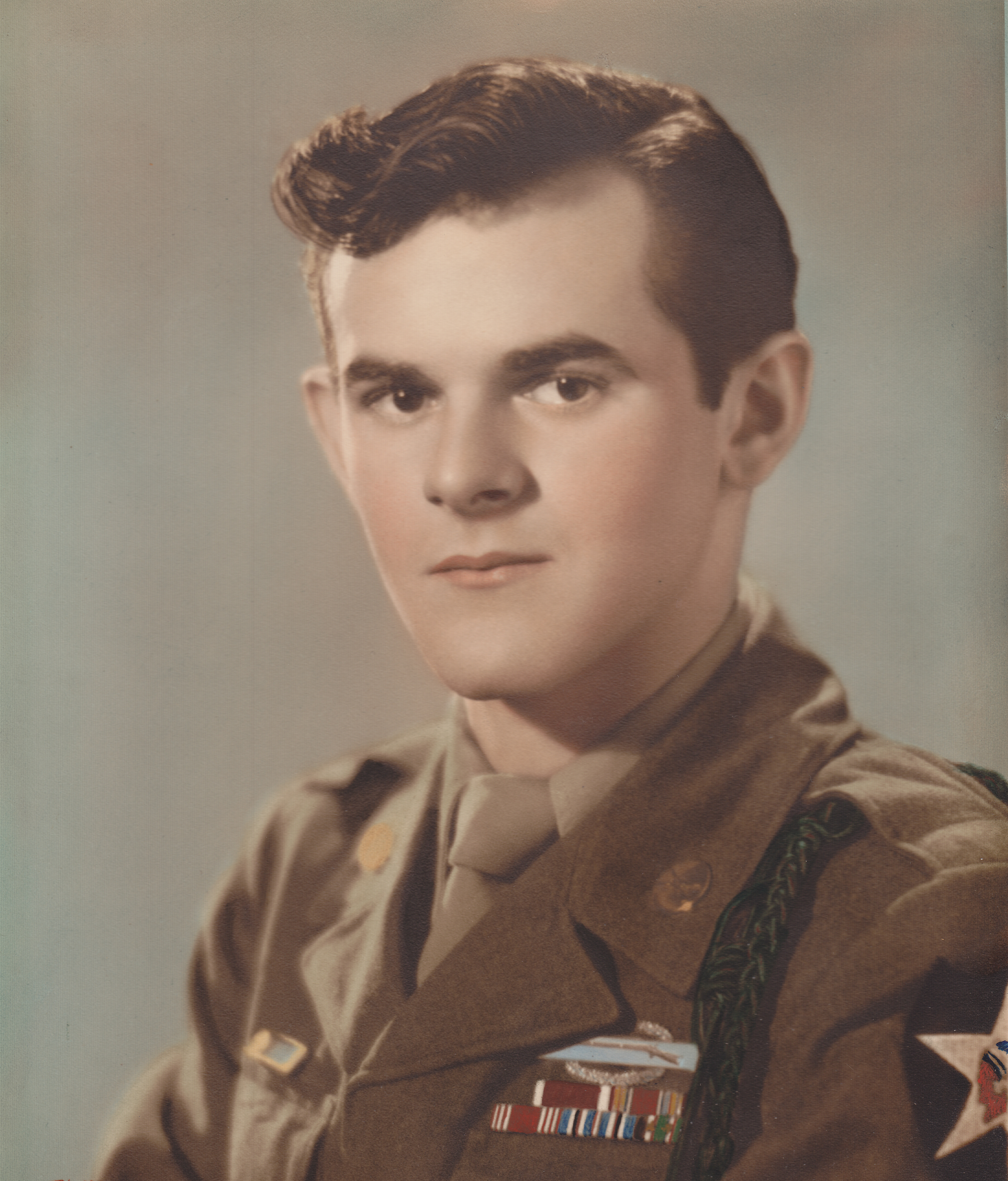
Bradt in World War II

Bradt was born May 2, 1924, in Evanston, Illinois, the youngest of three children. His father, A. Gordon Bradt, was vice president of the Continental Illinois National Bank and Trust Company, a professor at Northwestern University Graduate School of Business, and the author of several books on business. His mother, Aliff Bosier Bradt, was an artist, and a Girl Scouts Commissioner.

Bradt entered the University of Colorado in Boulder, Colorado, in 1942 as a student in the Engineering Department. Later that year, all men in the Army enlisted reserve corps were called for service, with the engineering students training for the Army Specialized Training Program. Bradt qualified for the program by 1943 at Colorado State University in Fort Collins, Colorado.

In 1944 Bradt was deployed to Europe for active duty with the 38th Infantry Regiment of the 2nd Infantry Division under General Hodges, and immediately saw action in The Battle of the Bulge. On March 31, 1945, Bradt was riding on the turret of a Sherman tank through Warburg, Germany, when the tank was hit by a German Panzerfaust rifle grenade. Bradt received multiple shrapnel wounds leaving him permanently disabled.

Bradt was honorably discharged from service at Fort Sheridan, Illinois, on March 25, 1946, and returned to the University of Colorado, graduating in 1949 with a degree in Business Engineering. While there, he met Collette Ireland from Denver, Colorado, the daughter of Jewel Cawthon Ireland and Gail L. Ireland, a former two-term Attorney General of Colorado serving during the four years of World War II. They were married on January 28, 1950, in Denver and moved to Gordon's hometown of Evanston, Illinois. There they had three children, Kristine, Terese and Andrew Gordon.

== Bell & Howell Company ==
Later in 1950, Bradt joined the Bell & Howell Company based near Skokie, Illinois. He began at Bell & Howell in the production planning department, and later held key positions in the engineering, marketing and product planning of the photographic and audio-visual products. This led to his role as Vice President of engineering and product management in the Consumer Products Group. In 1972 he was appointed President of the Industrial & Training Equipment Group, made up of the company's Audio-Visual, Avicom, and Professional Equipment Divisions.

At Bell & Howell, he worked in engineering design and was issued six U.S. patents assigned to Bell & Howell. In the era just before the advent of digital cameras, Bradt was at the forefront of setting the international standard for manufacturing a 8mm film cassette (Bradt et al., 1971). In 1970 Bradt and Bell & Howell announced that seven major European photographic manufacturing companies had chosen to standardize their own 8mm projectors on the Bell & Howell Auto 8 Movie Cassette System. Kodak had previously introduced a system, but it was not adopted as an industry standard, while manufacturing companies waited for Bell & Howell to introduce theirs. The Bell & Howell system was compatible with the existing film libraries of consumers, and made movie showing a simple procedure for the operator by simply dropping the film spools into a cartridge. The invention followed the recently introduced Bell & Howell Slide Cube system for projecting slide images.

Kinetico Abstracts 1974

Bradt developed many of his own designs and inventions when he was not working and traveling for Bell & Howell. He used every opportunity to travel to enhance his own personal pursuits, such as exporting a classic Maserati automobile from England to America to restore it. At home, he designed and built a boat he used to take his family on Lake Michigan and the Illinois River. Bradt also experimented with his own designs and inventions. In 1969, while still at Bell & Howell, Bradt was issued his first patent assigned to himself for an invention designed to permit playing of a guitar by unskilled persons. Titled "Chord-Forming Device for Stringed Instrument" (Bradt, 1969), the invention featured a guitar retrofitted with buttons controlling bars and wires that pressed against the strings, forming chords on the fret of the guitar, similar to an autoharp.

In the early 1960s Bradt and his wife Collette moved their family from Evanston, Illinois to Wilmette, Illinois, where he began creating the designs and inventions he would later be known for. In July 1973, after 23 years, he retired from Bell & Howell and went to work full-time creating abstract motorized kinetic sculptures. He and Collette launched Kinetico, Inc., and Bradt began a career as an artist and independent businessman, pitching his creations to a retail market.

== Kinetico Studios ==
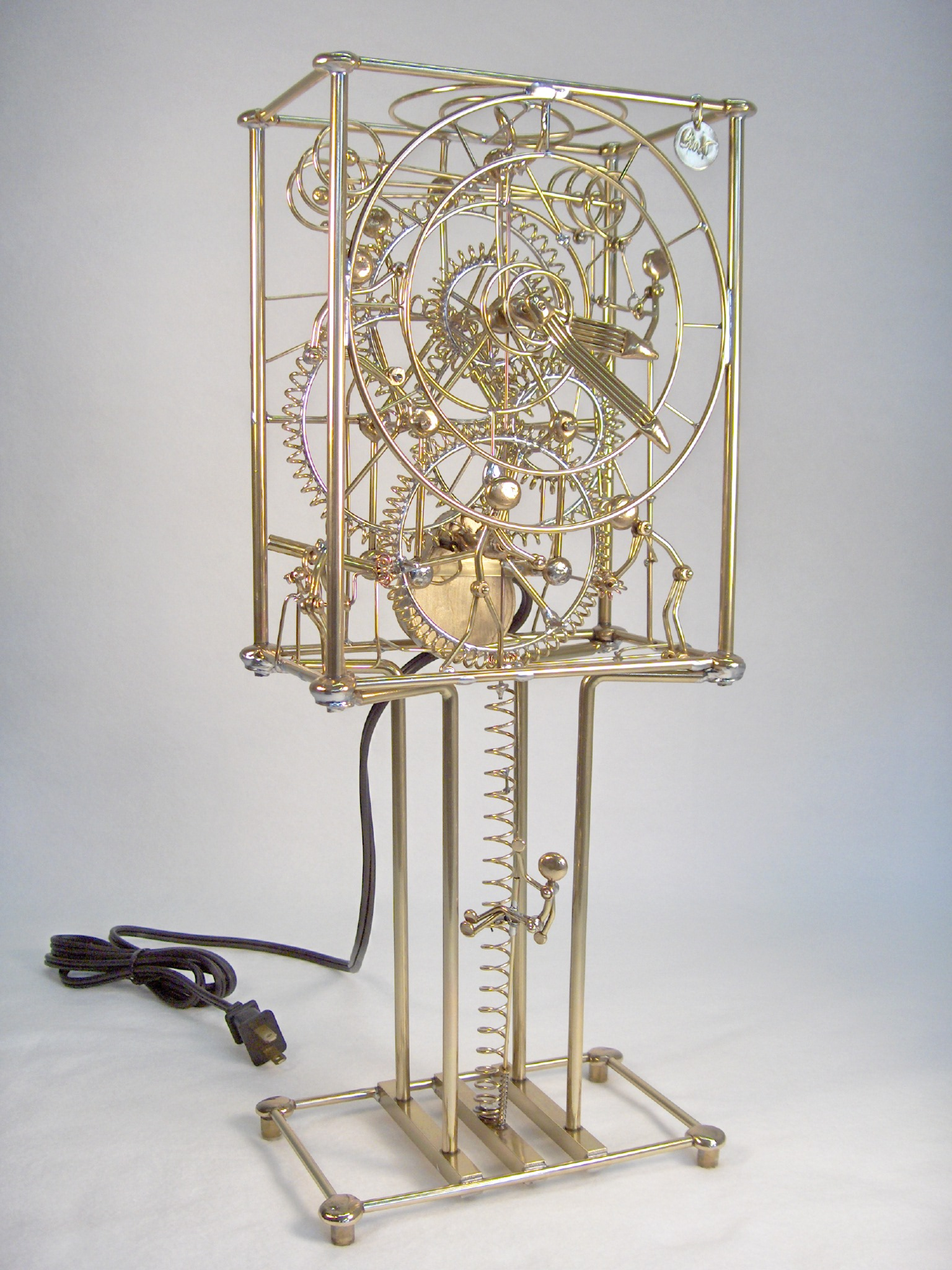
Gordon Bradt Kinetico Seven Man Clock

Kinetico incorporated in 1973. Kinetic art became the basis of Kinetico's product lines from then on. The products were almost always powered by AC electric synchronous timing motors. Materials used for the sculptures were metals and rosin, brazed, soldered or glued together. Bradt designed and built all necessary jigs for parts and assembly, and developed techniques for finishing, such as polishing processes and lacquer finishes.

The original product line included abstract moving table-top sculptures. Powered by the electric motors in the bases, fabricated wire kites and figures moved, swayed and bounced (Bradt, 1975). The sculptures were sold directly to retail gift shops and jewelry stores. As Collette sold the products and took care of the business, Bradt made the sculptures in his workshop in Wilmette. Bradt continued to develop new sculptures, and a line of animated, motorized sports figures emerged from the process.

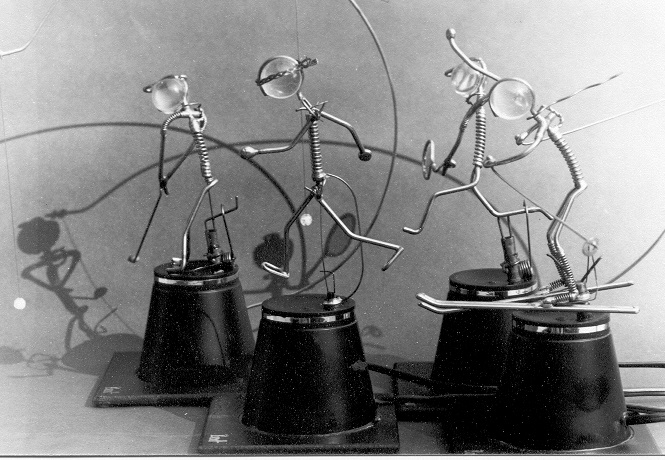
Kinetico Sports Figures 1975

In the summer of 1974, Bradt moved his family and the Kinetico operation to the Ozark Mountains in Northwest Arkansas, where he began production with a crew of local apprentices. The abstract product line continued for a year, but was soon replaced with the production of the Sports Figures.

Included in the new Sports Figure product line were the Golfer, Tennis Player, Fisherman, Baseball Player, Skier and Jogger. Bradt had been issued a U.S. patent for his motor base design in 1975, already in use for his abstract sculptures (Bradt, 1975). Now he utilized the same motor base for his sports figures. In 1977 he was issued a U.S. patent for the design of the sports figures themselves and the fittings into the motor base (Bradt, 1977). For ten years, the firm shipped the kinetic sports figures to dealers and distributors worldwide.

In 1980, Bradt designed the Six Man Clock, the basis for the clocks that Bradt and Kinetico created for the next 40 years. The same motor, materials and techniques were used. The gear train from the motor was made of coiled brass wire, engaging with pinion gears and detents. Six brass, brazed, bent and soldered "little men" worked off of a drive gear to appear to be making the clock move. In 1983, Bradt was issued a U.S. patent for his "Kinetic Clock Sculpture" (Bradt, 1983). The Arkansas State Patent Depository Library featured the patent on the cover of its brochure in 1991.

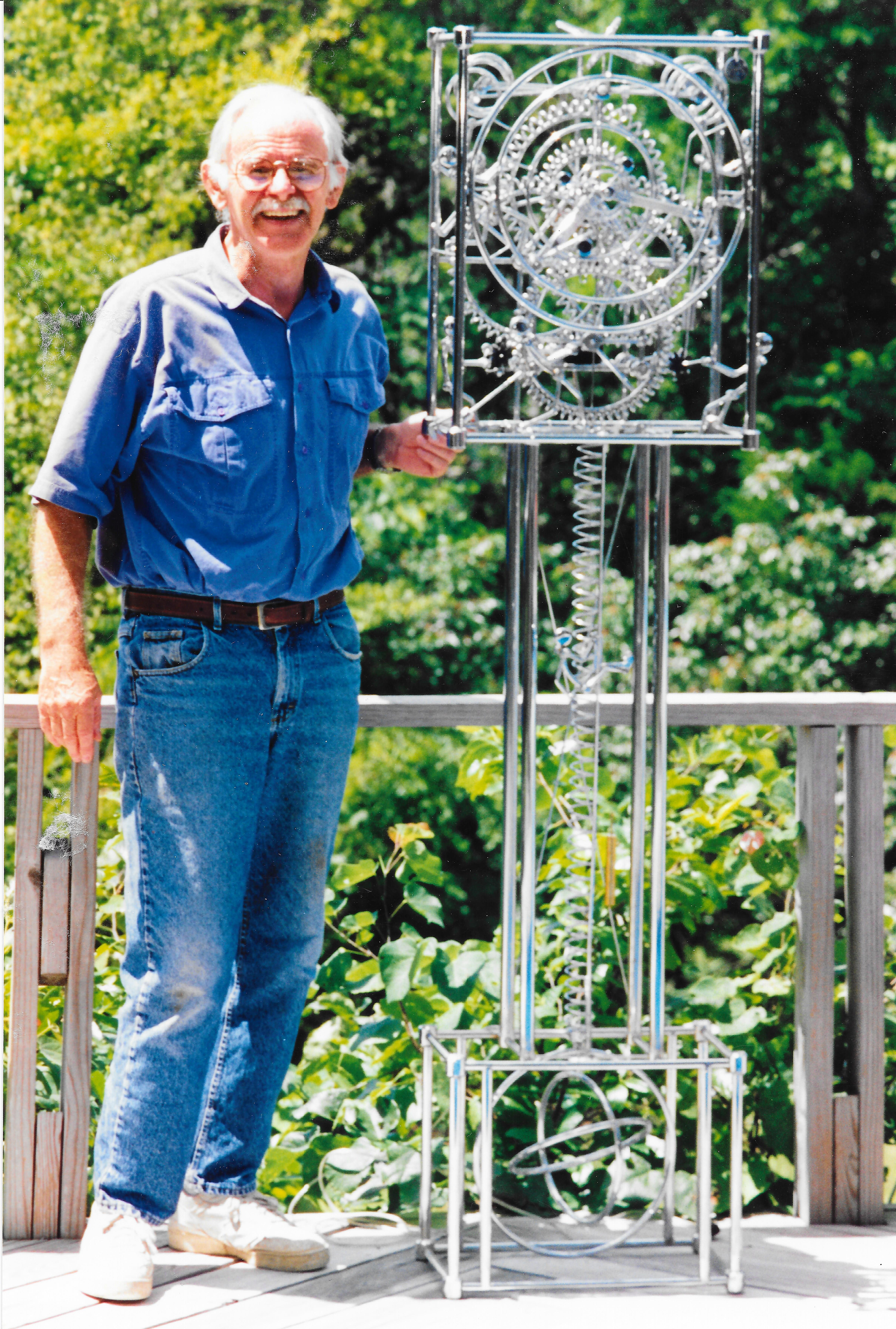
Gordon Bradt with his Grandfather Clock 1992

This led to a One Man Clock, a Three Man Clock (the Clock Junior), a Water Clock (Bradt, 1990), and eventually to a Seven Man Pedestal Clock. Bradt was issued a U.S. patent in 1992 for the pedestal device, titled "Animated Kinetic Sculpture Device" (Bradt, 1992). Soon Bradt was building Grandfather Clocks in his studios based on the Seven Man Clock. These chrome plated 6 ft. tall clocks were sent to dealers and collectors around the world. On February 2, 1993, Bradt's Grandfather Clock and Kinetico won Best in Show in "Gallery of Design and Innovation" at the Jewelers of America Show held in New York City. In addition to Best in Show, Kinetico also won First Place in the Innovative Design category at the show.

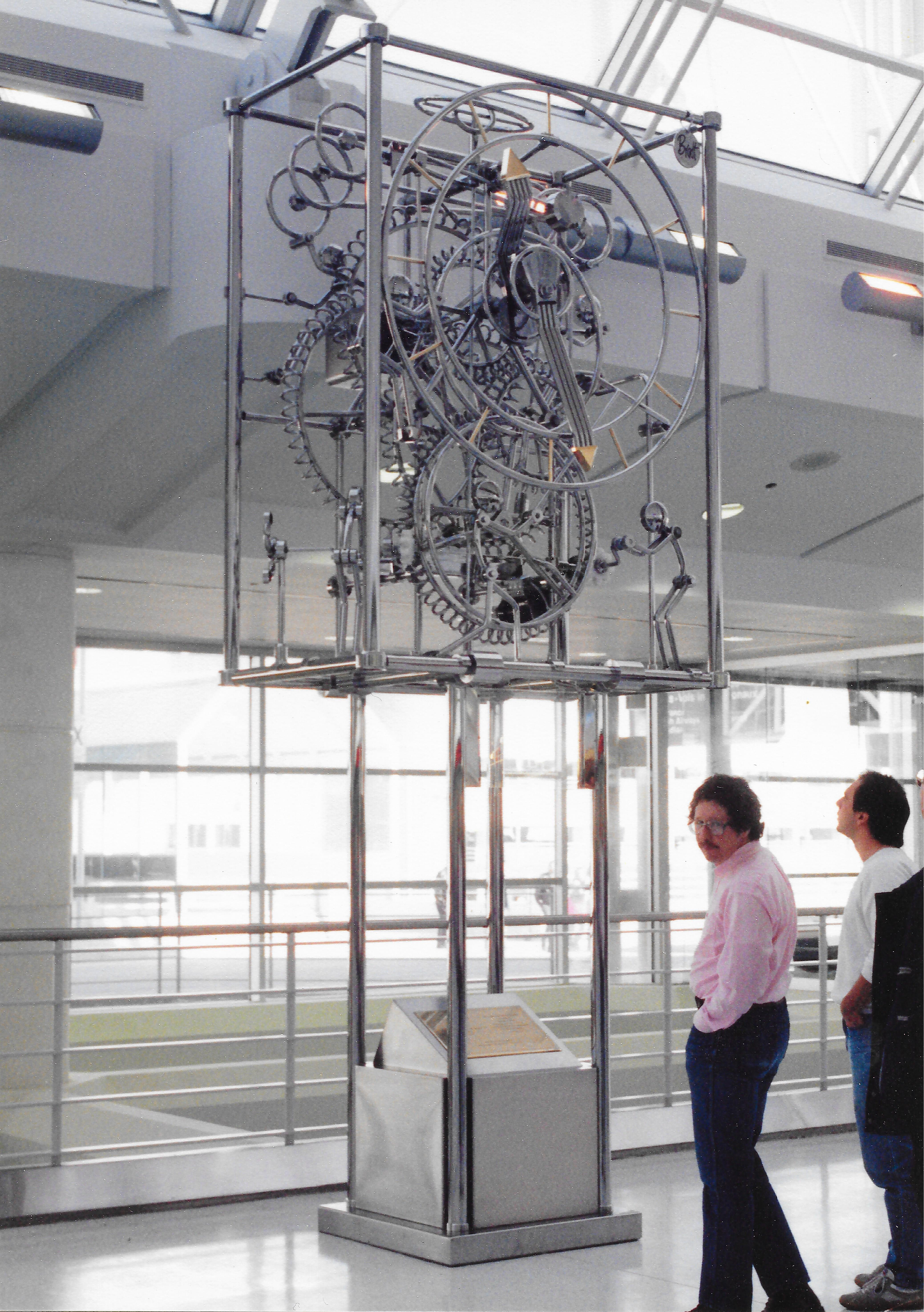
Gordon Bradt Clock in Toronto Airport 1991

As Bradt's Six Man Clock grew into bigger clocks, a 15 ft. tall chrome plated version was installed in Toronto, Ontario, Canada in the Great Hall of the new Toronto Pearson International Airport Terminal in 1991. In 1994, he built a 15 ft. tall chrome plated version of his Seven Man Pedestal Clock for the Pacific Science Center in Seattle, Washington.

== Other designs and inventions ==
Bradt continued designing and inventing throughout his life. Every new interest and hobby led to an idea and a prototype. During his interest in remote control airplanes, he designed and built a jig for building lightweight spoked airplane wheels, which he shared with the readers of Model Airplane News in 1999. This led him to design and build a prototype of a chair with two spoked wheels, which he patented as "Old Car Chair" (Bradt, 2001). His interest in airplanes inspired a ceiling fan blade design and assembly, also patented (Bradt, 2000). After getting his ham radio license, he and a fellow ham radio operator patented a mute and automatic restore device for communications receivers (Bradt & Bates, 1993). Spending time on the golf course inspired a "Battery Driven Golf Cart", which he built and patented (Bradt, 1985).

In all, Bradt was issued 13 patents as the assignee, and at least 6 patents assigned to Bell & Howell Company. In 2007, Bradt created a poster displaying his patents, featuring the patents of the Six Man Clock and the Pedestal device for the Seven Man Clock.

== Personal life ==
Bradt died on December 3, 2022, at the age of 98, at the Circle of Life Hospice, in Springdale, Arkansas. He was predeceased by his wife, Collette, and survived by his three children.
