= Loupe light =

Loupe combined with a light source

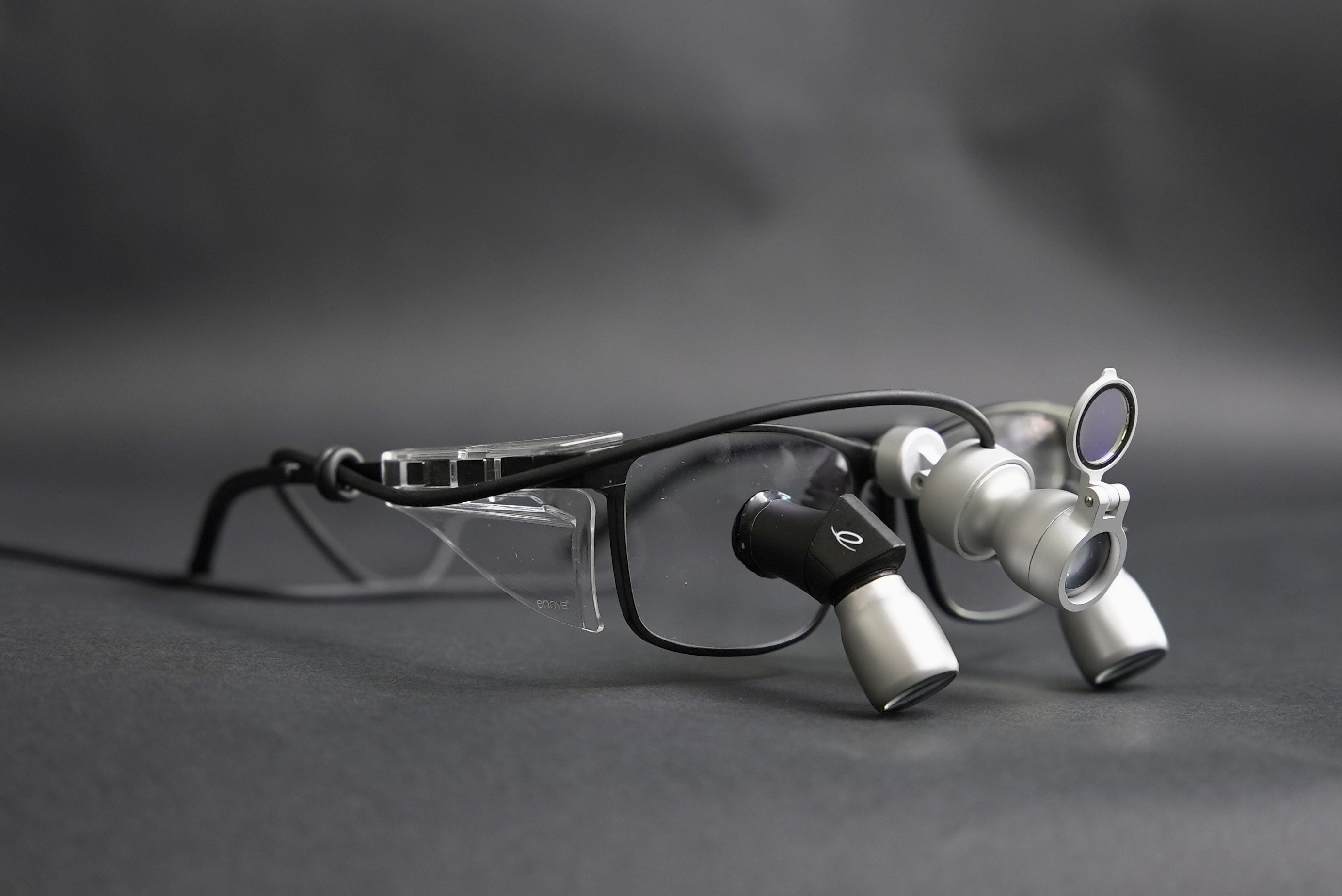
A pair of loupes with a light mounted

Loupe lights are used in conjunction with loupes. They are mainly used in the fields of medicine, dentistry and jewelry. Because loupes magnify a small field of vision, the amount of light that is focused into through the loupe is less than what is seen by just the naked eye. The dimness experienced is negligible for a nonprofessional user, but for professionals who require accuracy and precision and work in a confined area like dentistry, a loupe light provides illumination that will dramatically increase the level of detail they can see through loupes.

== Loupe lights in the field of dentistry ==
Loupe lights have become very advanced, and their use is growing. In the past, they used to be fiber optic and provided little portability in dentistry. Now, with technological advancements, LED loupe lights have become portable and more ergonomic - the lightest loupe light weighs just 3 grams. Loupe lights have decreased in size, become less bulky, are more comfortable to wear and have achieved a level of brightness that is almost blinding. Loupe lights that are corded tend to be much lighter than those that integrate battery packs within the light unit.

A loupe light allows dental practitioners to focus light into the oral cavity without patient discomfort from a bright light. Additionally, it is able to provide shadow-free light for the practitioner since it is mounted directly in between their eyes.
