= Pocket comparator =

Measuring instrument

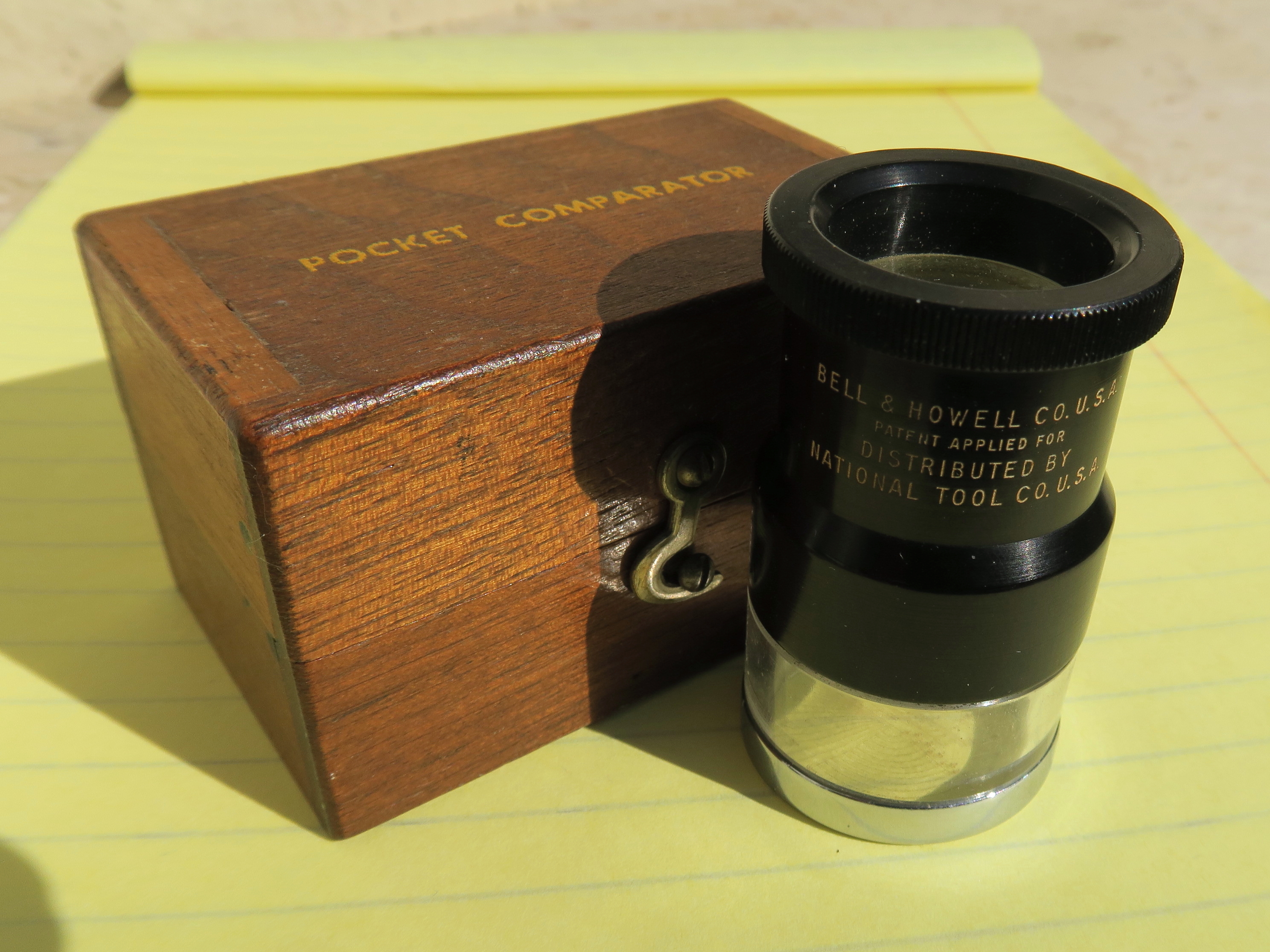
Bell & Howell Pocket Comparator

A pocket comparator is an optical device for measuring and inspection comprising a loupe and a reticle. The instrument was developed and manufactured by the Bell & Howell Company, but similar instruments of other names are made by other manufacturers.

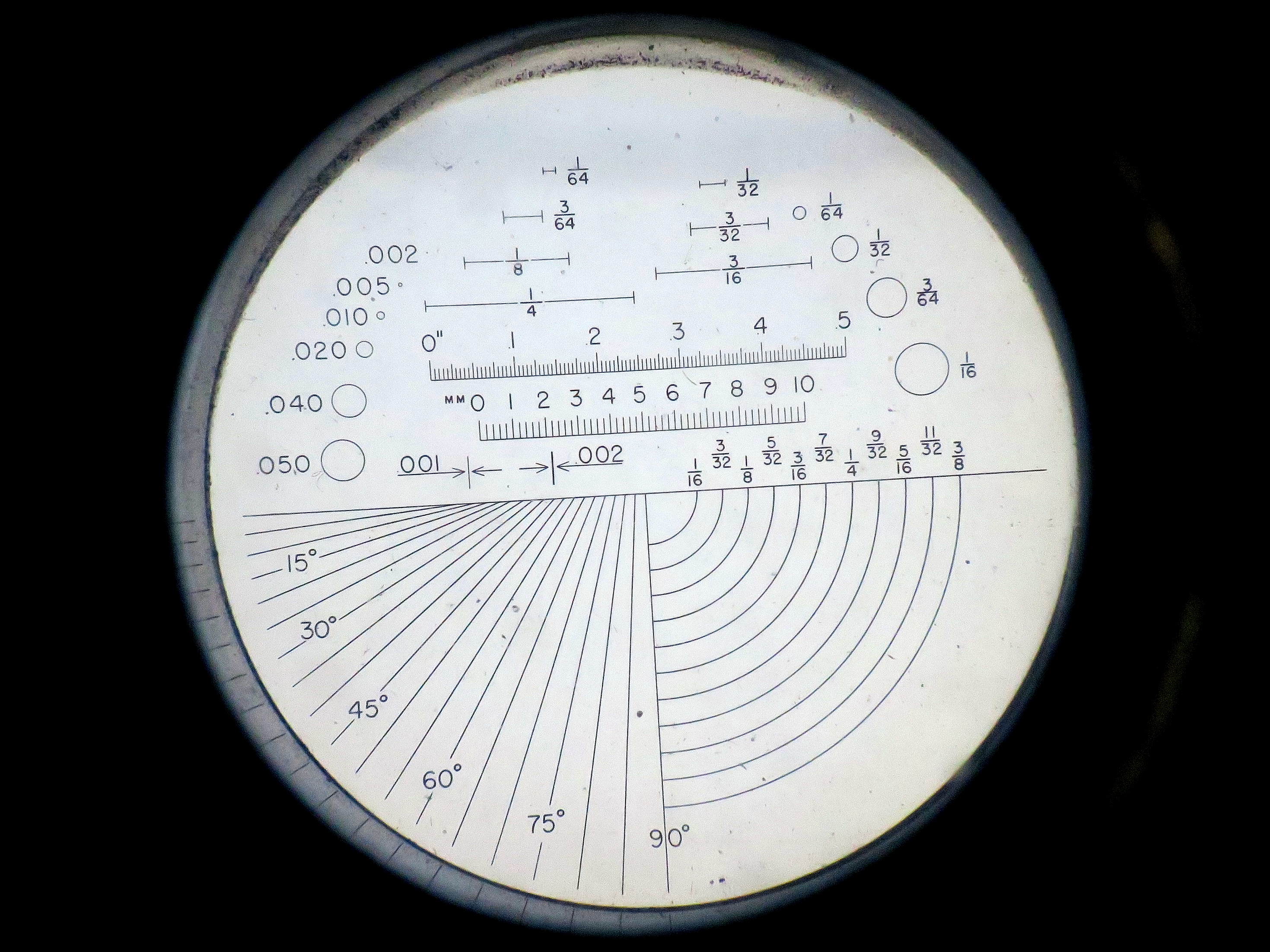
Reticle of Bell & Howell Pocket Comparator

Typographer Henri Friedlaender at work. Note Pocket Comparator at 01:10.

It is used for:

- Linear measurements in fractions of an inch
- Circular measurements in fractions of an inch
- Radius measurements
- Angle measurements
- Narrow line width measurements
- Circular measurements in decimals of an inch
- Linear measurements in inches
- Linear measurements in millimeters

Measurements are performed by bringing the surface of the reticle as close as possible to the work inspected.
